= Zero-knowledge password proof =

Cryptographic protocol

In cryptography, a zero-knowledge password proof (ZKPP) is a type of zero-knowledge proof that allows one party (the prover) to prove to another party (the verifier) that it knows a value of a password, without revealing anything other than the fact that it knows the password to the verifier. The term is defined in IEEE P1363.2, in reference to one of the benefits of using a password-authenticated key exchange (PAKE) protocol that is secure against off-line dictionary attacks. A ZKPP prevents any party from verifying guesses for the password without interacting with a party that knows it and, in the optimal case, provides exactly one guess in each interaction.

A common use of a zero-knowledge password proof is in authentication systems where one party wants to prove its identity to a second party using a password but doesn't want the second party or anybody else to learn anything about the password. For example, apps can validate a password without processing it and a payment app can check the balance of an account without touching or learning anything about the amount.

== History ==
The first methods to demonstrate a ZKPP were the encrypted key exchange methods (EKE) described by Steven M. Bellovin and Michael Merritt in 1992. A considerable number of refinements, alternatives, and variations in the growing class of password-authenticated key agreement methods were developed in subsequent years. Standards for these methods include IETF RFC 2945, IEEE P1363.2, and ISO-IEC 11770-4.

== See also ==
- Cryptographic protocol
- Outline of cryptography
- Key-agreement protocol
- Secure Remote Password protocol
