= Nadia Heninger =

American cryptographer, computer security expert

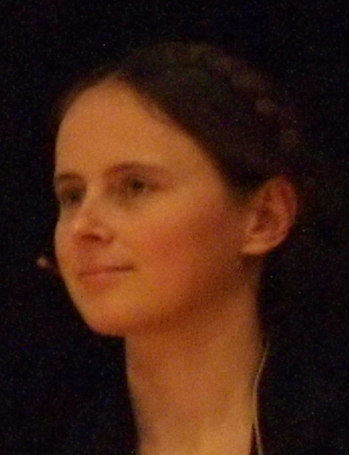
- Nadia Heninger
- Education: Princeton University; University of California, Berkeley
- Scientific career
- Fields: Computer Science; Cryptography; Computational number theory
- Workplaces: University of California, San Diego
- Doctoral advisor: Bernard Chazelle

Nadia Heninger (born 1982) is an American cryptographer, computer security expert, and computational number theorist at the University of California, San Diego.

== Contributions ==
Heninger is known for her work on freezing powered-down security devices to slow their fading memories and allow their secrets to be recovered via a cold boot attack,^{[A]} for her discovery that weak keys for the RSA cryptosystem are in widespread use by internet routers and other embedded devices,^{[B]} for her research on how failures of forward secrecy in bad implementations of the Diffie–Hellman key exchange may have allowed the National Security Agency to decrypt large amounts of internet traffic via the Logjam vulnerability,^{[C]} and for the DROWN attack, which uses servers supporting old and weak cryptography to decrypt traffic from modern clients to modern servers.^{[D]}

Heninger's other research contributions include a variant of the RSA cryptosystem that would be secure against quantum computers, an attack on implementations of the ANSI X9.31 cryptographically secure pseudorandom number generator that use hard-coded seed keys to initialize the generator, and the discovery of a side-channel attack against some versions of the libgcrypt cryptography library.

In 2015, Heninger was part of a team of proponents that included Matt Blaze, Steven M. Bellovin, J. Alex Halderman, and Andrea M. Matwyshyn who successfully proposed a security research exemption to Section 1201 of the Digital Millennium Copyright Act.

In 2025 Heninger was part of a team team that included Wenyi “Morty” Zhang, Annie Dai, Keegan Ryan, Dave Levin, and Aaron Schulman who with just $800 in basic equipment, found a stunning variety of data—including thousands of T-Mobile users' calls and texts and even US military communications—sent by satellites unencrypted. Their paper won the 2025 CCS distinguished paper award and was featured in Wired Magazine

== Education and career ==
Heninger graduated from the University of California, Berkeley in 2004, with a bachelor's degree in electrical engineering and computer science. She completed her doctorate in 2011 at Princeton University; her dissertation, Error Correction and the Cryptographic Key, was supervised by Bernard Chazelle. After postdoctoral research at the University of California, San Diego and Microsoft Research in New England, she became Magerman Term Assistant Professor at the University of Pennsylvania in 2013. In 2019, she returned to the University of California, San Diego.

== Recognition ==
Heninger's work on weak keys and on forward secrecy of Diffie–Hellman won best paper awards at the conferences at which they were presented, as have several of Heninger's other publications. She is one of the 2016 recipients of the Applied Networking Research Prize of the Internet Research Task Force.

She was an invited speaker at Asiacrypt 2016, speaking on "The reality of cryptographic deployments on the internet".

She is a 2026 International Association for Cryptologic Research Fellow for impactful contributions to the analysis of deployed cryptographic protocols and service to the IACR and the wider security community.

== Selected publications ==
A.	Halderman, J. Alex; Schoen, Seth D.; Heninger, Nadia; Clarkson, William; Paul, William; Calandrino, Joseph A.; Feldman, Ariel J.; Appelbaum, Jacob; Felten, Edward W. (May 2009), "Lest we remember: Cold-boot attacks on encryption keys", Communications of the ACM, 52 (5): 91–98, doi:10.1145/1506409.1506429, S2CID 7770695

B.	Heninger, Nadia; Durumeric, Zakir; Wustrow, Eric; Halderman, J. Alex (2012), "Mining your Ps and Qs: Detection of widespread weak keys in network devices" (PDF), Proceedings of the 21st USENIX Conference on Security Symposium (Security'12), Berkeley, CA, USA: USENIX Association, pp. 35:1–35:16

C.	Adrian, David; Bhargavan, Karthikeyan; Durumeric, Zakir; Gaudry, Pierrick; Green, Matthew; Halderman, J. Alex; Heninger, Nadia; Springall, Drew; Thomé, Emmanuel; Valenta, Luke; VanderSloot, Benjamin; Wustrow, Eric; Zanella-Béguelin, Santiago; Zimmermann, Paul (2015), "Imperfect forward secrecy: How Diffie-Hellman fails in practice", Proceedings of the 22nd ACM SIGSAC Conference on Computer and Communications Security (CCS '15), New York, NY, USA: ACM, pp. 5–17, doi:10.1145/2810103.2813707, ISBN 978-1-4503-3832-5

D.	Aviram, Nimrod; Schinzel, Sebastian; Somorovsky, Juraj; Heninger, Nadia; Dankel, Maik; Steube, Jens; Valenta, Luke; Adrian, David; Halderman, J. Alex; Dukhovni, Viktor; Käsper, Emilia; Cohney, Shaanan; Engels, Susanne; Paar, Christof; Shavitt, Yuval (August 2016), "DROWN: Breaking TLS with SSLv2" (PDF), 25th USENIX Security Symposium
