= Forward security =

Forward security could refer to:

- Forward contract, a financial instrument
- Forward secrecy a property of cryptographic protocols
