= Master key =

Master key may refer to:

- Master keying, a special type of key designed to open multiple locks
- Master Key, a pricing game on The Price Is Right
- Knight's Armament Company Masterkey, a door breaching shotgun
- One of the encryption keys used in a Master/Session encryption scheme
- Master Key (TV series), a South Korean variety show
- Master Key (Video Game) an independent video game by developer Achromi

== See also ==
- The Master Key (disambiguation)
