= IFES (disambiguation) =

IFES is the International Foundation for Electoral Systems.

IFES may also refer to:

- Integer Factorization Encryption Scheme, an encryption scheme described by IEEE P1363
- International Fellowship of Evangelical Students, an international Christian organization
