= Forward anonymity =

Forward anonymity is a property of a cryptographic system which prevents an attacker who has recorded past encrypted communications from discovering its contents and participants in the future. This property is analogous to forward secrecy.

An example of a system which uses forward anonymity is a public key cryptography system, where the public key is well-known and used to encrypt a message, and an unknown private key is used to decrypt it. In this system, one of the keys is always said to be compromised, but messages and their participants are still unknown by anyone without the corresponding private key.

In contrast, an example of a system which satisfies the perfect forward secrecy property is one in which a compromise of one key by an attacker (and consequent decryption of messages encrypted with that key) does not undermine the security of previously used keys. Forward secrecy does not refer to protecting the content of the message, but rather to the protection of keys used to decrypt messages.

== History ==
Originally introduced by Whitfield Diffie, Paul van Oorschot, and Michael James Wiener to describe a property of STS (station-to-station protocol) involving a long term secret, either a private key or a shared password.

== Public Key Cryptography ==
Public Key Cryptography is a common form of a forward anonymous system. It is used to pass encrypted messages, preventing any information about the message from being discovered if the message is intercepted by an attacker. It uses two keys, a public key and a private key. The public key is published, and is used by anyone to encrypt a plaintext message. The Private key is not well known, and is used to decrypt cyphertext. Public key cryptography is known as an asymmetric decryption algorithm because of different keys being used to perform opposing functions. Public key cryptography is popular because, while it is computationally easy to create a pair of keys, it is extremely difficult to determine the private key knowing only the public key. Therefore, the public key being well known does not allow messages which are intercepted to be decrypted. This is a forward anonymous system because one compromised key (the public key) does not compromise the anonymity of the system.

== Web of Trust ==
A variation of the public key cryptography system is a Web of trust, where each user has both a public and private key. Messages sent are encrypted using the intended recipient's public key, and only this recipient's private key will decrypt the message. They are also signed with the senders private key. This creates added security where it becomes more difficult for an attacker to pretend to be a user, as the lack of a private key signature indicates a non-trusted user.

== Limitations ==
A forward anonymous system does not necessarily mean a wholly secure system. A successful cryptanalysis of a message or sequence of messages can still decode the information without the use of a private key or long term secret.

== News ==
Forward anonymity, along with other privacy-protecting measures, received a burst of media attention after the leak of classified information by Edward Snowden, beginning in June, 2013, which indicated that the NSA and FBI, through specially crafted backdoors in software and computer systems, were conducting mass surveillance over large parts of the population of both the United States (see Mass surveillance in the United States), Europe, Asia, and other parts of the world. They justified this practice as an aid to catch predatory pedophiles. Opponents to this practice argue that leaving in a back door to law enforcement increases the risk of attackers being able to decrypt information, as well as questioning its legality under the US Constitution, specifically being a form of illegal Search and Seizure.
