= Andrea M. Matwyshyn =

Law and engineering professor

Academic background
- Education: Northwestern University (BA, MA International Relations, JD, PhD Human Development and Social Policy)
- Thesis: Silicon Ceilings: Information Technology Equity, the Digital Divide and the Gender Gap among Information Technology Professionals (2005)

Academic work
- Institutions: Northwestern University University of Florida University of Pennsylvania Princeton University Federal Trade Commission Northeastern University Penn State; John W. Kluge Center at Library of Congress
- Website: https://www.andreamm.com/

Andrea M. Matwyshyn is an American law professor and engineering professor at The Pennsylvania State University. She is known as a scholar of technology policy, particularly as an expert at the intersection of law and computer security and for her work with government. She is credited with originating the legal and policy concept of the Internet of Bodies.

== Biography ==
Matwyshyn received her BA with honors from Northwestern University in 1996, and her MA in international relations from Northwestern also in 1996. She received her JD with honors from Northwestern University Pritzker School of Law in 1999, and her PhD in Human Development and Social Policy, also from Northwestern, in 2005. Her thesis focused on individual level determinants of teens' interest in technology entrepreneurship and careers and was published in part as a law review article in 2003.

Between 1999 and 2003, Matwyshyn practiced law as a corporate attorney. Between 2003 and 2005, Matwyshyn was a faculty member in the Donald Pritzker Entrepreneurship Law Center at Northwestern University Pritzker School of Law. In 2005 she was appointed assistant professor, University of Florida Frederic G. Levin College of Law, and the faculty director of the Center for Information Research. In 2007 she was appointed an assistant professor, Legal Studies and Business Ethics, The Wharton School, University of Pennsylvania. In 2012, she became an affiliate scholar of the Stanford Center for Internet and Society. In 2014, Matwyshyn served as an academic in residence/senior policy advisor at the U.S. Federal Trade Commission, where her work focused on data security and consumer privacy initiatives.

In 2015, Matwyshyn was appointed as the Microsoft Visiting professor of Information Technology Policy at Princeton University's Center for Information Technology Policy in the School of Public and International Affairs and Department of Computer Science. During this time, she represented computer scientists Steve Bellovin, Matt Blaze, Alex Halderman, and Nadia Heninger and testified before the Copyright Office in a successful petition to obtain an exemption to Section 1201 of the Digital Millennium Copyright Act to permit information security research on consumer devices, including voting machines. In 2015 she was appointed Professor of Law at Northeastern University School of Law and co-founded the Center for Law, Innovation and Creativity (CLIC).

Beginning in 2019 Matwyshyn became the Associate Dean of Innovation and Technology and a professor on the Penn State Law faculty and a professor in the Penn State College of Engineering. She is also the founding director of the Penn State Policy Innovation Lab of Tomorrow (PILOT lab).

In 2022, Matwyshyn was appointed by the Federal Trade Commission's Bureau of Consumer Protection as a Senior Special Advisor on Law, Technology, and the Digital Economy. In 2023, she was appointed to the Consumer Financial Protection Bureau as a Senior Special Advisor on Information Security and Data Privacy.

== Honors ==
In 2016, Matwyshyn was awarded a US/UK Fulbright Cyber Security award. In 2017, she was named a Senior Fellow in the Cyber Statecraft Initiative at the Atlantic Council.

In 2019, Matwyshyn was named a MacCormick Fellow at the University of Edinburgh Law School and a visiting researcher at Centre Internet et Societe in CNRS at the Sorbonne. She was also appointed a fellow in residence at the John W. Kluge Center at the Library of Congress.

In 2020, her work on the Internet of Bodies (IoB) was used as a springboard for reports on the topic by Rand Corporation and the World Economic Forum. She is also part of an IEEE team of technology experts who generate annual trend predictions and the Washington Post's team of cybersecurity experts.

In 2021, she became the founding faculty director of the Anuncia Donecia Songsong Manglona Lab for Gender and Economic Equity at Penn State Law, after a $1 million donation was made by Katie Moussouris.

== Select publications ==
=== Books ===
- Matwyshyn, Andrea M. (2009). Harboring Data: Information Security, Law, and the Corporation. Stanford University Press. ISBN 978-0-8047-7259-4.

=== Journal articles ===
- Matwyshyn, A. (2006). "Material Vulnerabilities: Data Privacy, Corporate Information Security and Securities Regulation" (PDF). Berkeley Business Law Journal. 3 (1). doi:10.15779/Z38456S. S2CID 20460212.
- —— (2007). "Technoconsen(t)sus". Washington University Law Review. 85 (3): 529–574. ISSN 2166-7993.
- ——; Cui, Ang; Keromytis, Angelos D.; Stolfo, Salvatore J. (March–April 2010). "Ethics in Security Vulnerability Research" (PDF). IEEE Security & Privacy. 8 (2): 67–72. Bibcode:2010ISPri...8b..67F. doi:10.1109/MSP.2010.67. S2CID 17734890.
- —— (2013). "Hacking Speech: Informational Speech and the First Amendment". Northwestern University Law Review. 107 (2): 795–846. ISSN 0029-3571.
- —— (November 2013). "Privacy, the Hacker Way". Southern California Law Review. 87 (1). SSRN 3004803.
- —— (July 2017). "CYBER!". BYU Law Review. 2017 (5): 1109–1195.
- —— (October 2019). "The Internet of Bodies". William & Mary Law Review. 61 (1): 77–167. ISSN 0043-5589.
