= Matt Blaze =

American researcher

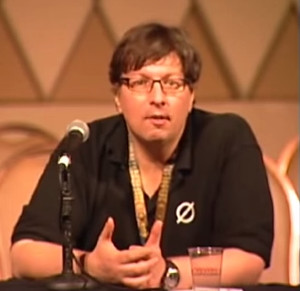
- Matt Blaze at DEF CON 20 in 2012
- Citizenship: American
- Education: Princeton University (MA, PhD); Columbia University (MS); Hunter College (BS)
- Known for: Cryptography; Trust management
- Scientific career
- Fields: Computer security Distributed systems
- Workplaces: Georgetown University; University of Pennsylvania; Bell Labs
- Website: MattBlaze.org

Matt Blaze is an American researcher who focuses on the areas of secure systems, cryptography, and trust management. He is currently the McDevitt Chair of Computer Science and Law at Georgetown University, and is on the board of directors of the Tor Project.

== Work ==
Blaze received his PhD in computer science from Princeton University.

In 1992, while working for AT&T, Blaze implemented a strong cryptographic package known as "CFS", the Cryptographic File System, for Unix, since ported to Linux. CFS uses Network File System as its transport mechanism, allowing users to encrypt selected directory hierarchies, but mount them unencrypted after providing the key. In November, 1993, he presented a paper on this project, "A Cryptographic File System for Unix", at the 1st ACM Conference on Computer and Communications Security. Blaze also published a paper "Key Management in an Encrypting File System", in the Proceedings USENIX Summer 1994 Technical Conference.

In the early 1990s, at the height of the "crypto war", Blaze was a participant in the Cypherpunks mailing list and in 1994, he found a critical weakness in the wiretapping mechanisms of the Clipper chip. His paper, Protocol Failure in the Escrowed Encryption Standard, pointed out that the Clipper's escrow system had a serious vulnerability: a brute-force attack could allow the Clipper chip to be used as an encryption device, while disabling the key escrow capability. Later during this time, he was one of the authors of a seminal paper on calculating secure key lengths.

After leaving Bell, Blaze was an associate professor of computer and information science at the University of Pennsylvania from 2004 to 2018. Blaze has noted a long-term conflict with the university's locksmith over his master key & safecracking publications. He then joined the faculty at Georgetown University, on a joint appointment at Georgetown Law and the department of computer science.

In 2015, Blaze was part of a team of proponents that included Steven M. Bellovin, J. Alex Halderman, Nadia Heninger, and Andrea M. Matwyshyn who successfully proposed a security research exemption to Section 1201 of the Digital Millennium Copyright Act.

In July 2016, the complete board of the Tor Project resigned and announced a new board, including Matt Blaze.

In 2018, cryptocurrency company Monaco paid Blaze an undisclosed amount for the rights to the domain Crypto.com. Blaze had registered the domain in 1993 and sellers have estimated that the value of the domain was US$5–10 million.

== Education ==
- Ph.D., Computer Science, January 1993. Princeton University. (Dissertation: Caching in Large-Scale Distributed File Systems)
- M.A., Computer Science, June 1989. Princeton University
- M.S., Computer Science, May 1988. Columbia University
- B.S., January 1986. City University of New York (Hunter College)

== Publications ==
- Ioannidis, John; Blaze, Matt. The Architecture and Implementation of Network-Layer Security Under Unix, in Proc. of the 4th USENIX Security Symp., pages 29–39, Santa Clara, California, US, October 1993.
- Bellovin, Steven M.; Blaze, Matt; Landau, Susan; Pell, Stephanie K. It's Too Complicated: How the Internet Upends Katz, Smith, and Electronic Surveillance Law, in Harvard Journal of Law and Technology Volume 30.1, pages 1–101. February 2017.
- Bellovin, Steven M.; Blaze, Matt; Landau, Susan; Owsley, Brian L. Seeking the Source: Criminal Defendants’ Constitutional Right to Source Code in Ohio State Technology Law Journal Volume 17.1, pages 1–73. December 2020.
