= Static key =

A cryptographic key is called static if it is intended for use for a relatively long period of time and is typically intended for use in many instances of a cryptographic key establishment scheme. Contrast with an ephemeral key.

== See also ==
- Cryptographic key types
- Recommendation for Key Management — Part 1: general,
- NIST Cryptographic Toolkit
