= Trust management (information system) =

In information system and information technology, trust management is a framework that evaluates and represents trust relationships to support automated decision-making. These representations allow systems to assess whether entities—users, devices, or services—can be trusted. Trust management is commonly applied in information security, particularly in the enforcement of access control policies.

The concept of trust management has been introduced by Matt Blaze to aid the automated verification of actions against security policies. In this concept, actions are allowed if they demonstrate sufficient credentials, irrespective of their actual identity, separating symbolic representation of trust from the actual person.

Trust management can be best illustrated through the everyday experience of tickets. One can buy a ticket that entitles them e.g. to enter the stadium. The ticket acts as a symbol of trust, stating that the bearer of the ticket has paid for their seat and is entitled to enter. However, once bought, the ticket can be transferred to someone else, thus transferring such trust in a symbolic way. At the gate, only the ticket will be checked, not the identity of a bearer.

== Overview ==
Trust management can be seen as a symbol-based automation of social decisions related to trust, where social agents instruct their technical representations how to act while meeting technical representations of other agents. Further automation of this process can lead to automated trust negotiations (e.g. see Winslett) where technical devices negotiate trust by selectively disclosing credential, according to rules defined by social agents that they represent. The definition and perspective on trust management was expanded in 2000 to include concepts of honesty, truthfulness, competence and reliability, in addition to trust levels, the nature of the trust relationship and the context.

Web Services Trust Language (WS-Trust) brings trust management into the environment of web services. The core proposition remain generally unchanged: the Web Service (verifier) is accepting a request only if the request contains proofs of claims (credentials) that satisfy the policy of a Web Service.

It is also possible to let technical agents monitor each other's behaviour and respond accordingly by increasing or decreasing trust. Such systems are collectively called Trust-Based Access Control (TBAC) and their applicability have been studied for several different application areas.

An alternative view on trust management questions the possibility to technically manage trust, and focuses on supporting the proper assessment of the extent of trust one person has in the other.

Trust management is also studied in specific IT-related field such as transportation.

Trust management is an important topic in online social network these days.
