= The Master Key =

The Master Key may refer to:

== Literature ==
- The Master Key (Baum novel), a children's book by L. Frank Baum
- The Master Key, a 1914 personal development book by L. W. de Laurence
- The Master Key (Togawa novel), a 1962 mystery by Masako Togawa
- The Master Key System, a personal development book by Charles F. Haanel

== Film ==
- The Master Key (1914 serial), by Universal Studios
- The Master Key (1945 serial), by Universal Studios
- The Master Key (2009 film), a Canadian fantasy/mystery film

== See also ==
- Master key (disambiguation)
