= Tamper-resistant security module =

A tamper-resistant security module is a physical computing device that safeguards and manages cryptographic keys and provides cryptographic processing. Hardware security modules provide tamper-evident and intrusion-resistant protection for digital keys and other secrets.

There are varying levels of protection afforded by TRSMs:

1. Tamper-resistance: make intrusion difficult, usually by employing hardened casing
2. Tamper-evident: make intrusion attempts evident to subsequent viewers, often by employing seals which must be broken during intrusion
3. Tamper-responsive: detect the intrusion attempt and destroy the contents in the process

A TRSM is usually also a hardware security module (HSM).
