= IEEE P1363 =

IEEE standardization project for public-key cryptography

IEEE P1363 is an Institute of Electrical and Electronics Engineers (IEEE) standardization project for public-key cryptography. It includes specifications for:

- Traditional public-key cryptography (IEEE Std 1363-2000 and 1363a-2004)
- Lattice-based public-key cryptography (IEEE Std 1363.1-2008)
- Password-based public-key cryptography (IEEE Std 1363.2-2008)
- Identity-based public-key cryptography using pairings (IEEE Std 1363.3-2013)

The chair of the working group as of October 2008 is William Whyte of NTRU Cryptosystems, Inc., who has served since August 2001. Former chairs were Ari Singer, also of NTRU (1999–2001), and Burt Kaliski of RSA Security (1994–1999).

The IEEE Standard Association withdrew all of the 1363 standards except 1363.3-2013 on 7 November 2019.

== Traditional public-key cryptography (IEEE Std 1363-2000 and 1363a-2004) ==
This specification includes key agreement, signature, and encryption schemes using several mathematical approaches: integer factorization, discrete logarithm, and elliptic curve discrete logarithm.

=== Key agreement schemes ===
- DL/ECKAS-DH1 and DL/ECKAS-DH2 (Discrete Logarithm/Elliptic Curve Key Agreement Scheme, Diffie–Hellman version): This includes both traditional Diffie–Hellman and elliptic curve Diffie–Hellman.
- DL/ECKAS-MQV (Discrete Logarithm/Elliptic Curve Key Agreement Scheme, Menezes–Qu–Vanstone version)

=== Signature schemes ===
- DL/ECSSA (Discrete Logarithm/Elliptic Curve Signature Scheme with Appendix): Includes four main variants: DSA, ECDSA, Nyberg-Rueppel, and Elliptic Curve Nyberg-Rueppel.
- IFSSA (Integer Factorization Signature Scheme with Appendix): Includes two variants of RSA, Rabin-Williams, and ESIGN, with several message encoding methods. "RSA1 with EMSA3" is essentially PKCS#1 v1.5 RSA signature; "RSA1 with EMSA4 encoding" is essentially RSA-PSS; "RSA1 with EMSA2 encoding" is essentially ANSI X9.31 RSA signature.
- DL/ECSSR (Discrete Logarithm/Elliptic Curve Signature Scheme with Recovery)
- DL/ECSSR-PV (Discrete Logarithm/Elliptic Curve Signature Scheme with Recovery, Pintsov-Vanstone version)
- IFSSR (Integer Factorization Signature Scheme with Recovery)

=== Encryption schemes ===
- IFES (Integer Factorization Encryption Scheme): Essentially RSA encryption with Optimal Asymmetric Encryption Padding (OAEP).
- DL/ECIES (Discrete Logarithm/Elliptic Curve Integrated Encryption Scheme): Essentially the "DHAES" variant of ElGamal encryption.
- IFES-EPOC (Integer Factorization Encryption Scheme, EPOC version)

== Lattice-based public key cryptography (IEEE Std 1363.1-2008) ==
- NTRU encryption scheme

== Password-based public-key cryptography (IEEE Std 1363.2-2008) ==
This document includes a number of password-authenticated key agreement schemes, and a password-authenticated key retrieval scheme.

- BPKAS-PAK (Balanced Password-Authenticated Key Agreement Scheme, version PAK)
- BPKAS-PPK (version PPK)
- BPKAS-SPEKE (version SPEKE)
- APKAS-AMP (Augmented Password-Authenticated Key Agreement Scheme, version AMP)
- APKAS-BSPEKE2 (version BSPEKE2)
- APKAS-PAKZ (version PAKZ)
- APKAS-SRP3 and SRP6 (version Secure Remote Password (SRP) 3 and 6)
- APKAS-SRP5 (version Secure Remote Password (SRP) 5)
- APKAS-WSPEKE (version WSPEKE)
- PKRS-1 (Password Authenticated Key Retrieval Scheme, version 1)

== Identity-based public key cryptography based on pairings (IEEE Std 1363.3-2013) ==
This standard was published on 15 November 2013. It includes techniques for identity-based encryption, signatures, signcryption, key agreement, and proxy re-encryption, all based on bilinear pairings.
