= Application-Layer Protocol Negotiation =

Feature of the TLS network security protocol

Application-Layer Protocol Negotiation (ALPN) is a Transport Layer Security (TLS) extension that allows the application layer to negotiate which protocol should be performed over a secure connection in a manner that avoids additional round trips and which is independent of the application-layer protocols. It is used to establish HTTP/2 connections without additional round trips (client and server can communicate over two ports previously assigned to HTTPS with HTTP/1.1 and upgrade to use HTTP/2 or continue with HTTP/1.1 without closing the initial connection).

== Support ==
ALPN is supported by these libraries:

- BSAFE Micro Edition Suite since version 5.0
- GnuTLS since version 3.2.0 released in May 2013
- MatrixSSL since version 3.7.1 released in December 2014
- Network Security Services since version 3.15.5 released in April 2014
- OpenSSL since version 1.0.2 released in January 2015
- LibreSSL since version 2.1.3 released in January 2015
- mbed TLS (previously PolarSSL) since version 1.3.6 released in April 2014
- s2n since its original public release in June 2015.
- wolfSSL (formerly CyaSSL) since version 3.7.0 released in October 2015
- Go (in the standard library crypto/tls package) since version 1.4 released in December 2014
- JSSE in Java since JDK 9 released in September 2017, backported to JDK 8 released in April 2020
- Win32 SSPI since Windows 8.1 and Windows Server 2012 R2 were released October 18, 2013
- Rustls

== History ==
=== Next Protocol Negotiation ===
In January 2010, Google introduced IETF standard draft describing Next Protocol Negotiation TLS extension. This extension was used to negotiate experimental SPDY connections between Google Chrome and some of Google's servers. As SPDY evolved, NPN was replaced with ALPN.

=== Application-Layer Protocol Negotiation ===
On July 11, 2014, ALPN was published as RFC 7301. ALPN replaces Next Protocol Negotiation (NPN) extension.

TLS False Start was disabled in Google Chrome from version 20 (2012) onward except for websites with the earlier NPN extension.

== Example ==
ALPN is a TLS extension which is sent on the initial TLS handshake 'Client Hello', and it lists the protocols that the client (for example the web browser) supports:

    Handshake Type: Client Hello (1)
    Length: 141
    Version: TLS 1.2 (0x0303)
    Random: dd67b5943e5efd0740519f38071008b59efbd68ab3114587...
    Session ID Length: 0
    Cipher Suites Length: 10
    Cipher Suites (5 suites)
    Compression Methods Length: 1
    Compression Methods (1 method)
    Extensions Length: 90
    [other extensions omitted]
    Extension: application_layer_protocol_negotiation (len=14)
        Type: application_layer_protocol_negotiation (16)
        Length: 14
        ALPN Extension Length: 12
        ALPN Protocol
            ALPN string length: 2
            ALPN Next Protocol: h2
            ALPN string length: 8
            ALPN Next Protocol: http/1.1

The resulting 'Server Hello' from the web server will also contain the ALPN extension, and it confirms which protocol will be used for the HTTP request:

    Handshake Type: Server Hello (2)
    Length: 94
    Version: TLS 1.2 (0x0303)
    Random: 44e447964d7e8a7d3b404c4748423f02345241dcc9c7e332...
    Session ID Length: 32
    Session ID: 7667476d1d698d0a90caa1d9a449be814b89a0b52f470e2d...
    Cipher Suite: TLS_ECDHE_RSA_WITH_AES_128_GCM_SHA256 (0xc02f)
    Compression Method: null (0)
    Extensions Length: 22
    [other extensions omitted]
    Extension: application_layer_protocol_negotiation (len=5)
        Type: application_layer_protocol_negotiation (16)
        Length: 5
        ALPN Extension Length: 3
        ALPN Protocol
            ALPN string length: 2
            ALPN Next Protocol: h2
