= Cryptlib =

Open source software security toolkit library

cryptlib
- Developer(s): Peter Gutmann
- Initial release: 1995
- Stable release: 3.4.8 (2025; 0 years ago) [±]
- Repository: github.com/cryptlib/cryptlib
- Written in: C
- Type: Security library
- License: Sleepycat (Berkeley Database) License
- Website: github.com/cryptlib/cryptlib

cryptlib is an open-source cross-platform software security toolkit library. It is distributed under the Sleepycat License, a free software license compatible with the GNU General Public License. Alternatively, cryptlib is available under a proprietary license for those preferring to use it under proprietary terms.

== Features ==
cryptlib is a security toolkit library that allows programmers to incorporate encryption and authentication services to software. It provides a high-level interface, so that strong security capabilities can be added to an application without needing to know many of the low-level details of encryption or authentication algorithms. Extensive documentation in the form of a 400+ page programming manual is available.

At the highest level, cryptlib provides implementations of complete security services such as S/MIME and PGP/OpenPGP secure enveloping, SSL/TLS and SSH secure sessions, CA services such as CMP, SCEP, SCVP, RTCS, OCSP, and other security operations such as secure timestamping. Since cryptlib uses industry-standard X.509, S/MIME, PGP/OpenPGP, and SSH/SSL/TLS data formats, the resulting encrypted or signed data can be easily transported to other systems and processed there, and cryptlib itself runs on many operating systems—all Windows versions and most Unix/Linux systems. This allows email, files, and EDI transactions to be authenticated with digital signatures and encrypted in an industry-standard format.

cryptlib provides other capabilities including full X.509/PKIX certificate handling (all X.509 versions from X.509v1 to X.509v4) with support for SET, Microsoft AuthentiCode, Identrus, SigG, S/MIME, SSL, and Qualified certificates, PKCS #7 certificate chains, handling of certification requests and CRLs (certificate revocation lists) including automated checking of certificates against CRLs and online checking using RTCS and OCSP, and issuing and revoking certificates using CMP and SCEP. It also implements a full range of certification authority (CA) functions provides complete CMP, SCEP, RTCS, and OCSP server implementations to handle online certificate enrolment/issue/revocation and certificate status checking. Alongside the certificate handling, it provides a sophisticated key storage interface that allows the use of a wide range of key database types ranging from PKCS #11 devices, PKCS #15 key files, and PGP/OpenPGP key rings to commercial-grade RDBMS and LDAP directories with optional SSL protection.

cryptlib can make use of the cryptographic capabilities of a variety of external cryptographic devices such as hardware cryptographic accelerators, Fortezza cards, PKCS #11 devices, hardware security modules (HSMs), and cryptographic smart cards. It can be used with a variety of cryptography devices that have received FIPS 140 or ITSEC/Common Criteria certification. The cryptographic device interface also provides a general-purpose plug-in capability for adding new functionality that can be used by cryptlib.

cryptlib is written in C and supports BeOS, DOS, IBM MVS, Mac OS X, OS/2, Tandem, a variety of Unix versions (including AIX, Digital Unix, DGUX, FreeBSD/NetBSD/OpenBSD, HP-UX, IRIX, Linux, MP-RAS, OSF/1, QNX, SCO UnixWare, Solaris, SunOS, Ultrix, and UTS4), VM/CMS, Windows 3.x, Windows 95/98/ME, Windows CE/PocketPC/SmartPhone and Windows NT/2000/XP/Vista. It is designed to be portable to other embedded system environments. It is available as a standard DLL. Language bindings are available for C / C++, C# / .NET, Delphi, Java, Python, and Visual Basic (VB).

=== Algorithm support ===
Ciphers
Algorithm	Key size	Block size
AES	128/192/256	128
Blowfish	448	64
CAST-128	128	64
ChaCha20	128 / 256	8
DES	56	64
Triple DES	112 / 168	64
IDEA	128	64
RC2	1024	64
RC4	2048	8

Hashes
Algorithm	Digest size
MD5	128
SHA-1	160
SHA-2	256 / 384 / 512

MACs
Algorithm	Key size	Digest size
HMAC-MD5	128	128
HMAC-SHA-1	160	160
HMAC-SHA-2	256	256 / 384 / 512
Poly1305	128	128

Public-key
Algorithm	Key size
Diffie–Hellman	4096
DSA	4096
ECDSA	256 / 384 521
ECDH	256 / 384 / 521
Elgamal	4096
RSA	4096

== Release History ==
- cryptlib 3.4.8 was released on May 1, 2025; 4 months ago.
- cryptlib 3.4.5 was released on March 8, 2019; 6 years ago.
- cryptlib 3.4.4.1 was released on August 21, 2018; 7 years ago.
- cryptlib 3.4.4 was released on January 10, 2018; 7 years ago.
- cryptlib 3.4.3 was released on March 25, 2016; 9 years ago.
- cryptlib 3.4.2 was released on December 17, 2012; 12 years ago.
- cryptlib 3.4.1 was released on July 27, 2011; 14 years ago.
- cryptlib 3.4.0 was released on October 6, 2010; 14 years ago.
- cryptlib 3.3.2 was released on July 3, 2008; 17 years ago.
- cryptlib 3.3.1 was released on February 1, 2007; 18 years ago.
- cryptlib 3.3 was released on September 13, 2006; 18 years ago.
- cryptlib 3.2.3a was released on August 29, 2006; 19 years ago.
- cryptlib 3.2.3 was released on July 10, 2006; 19 years ago.
- cryptlib 3.2.2 was released on September 6, 2005; 20 years ago.
- cryptlib 3.2.1 was released on August 9, 2005; 20 years ago.
- cryptlib 3.2 was released on April 18, 2005; 20 years ago.
- cryptlib 3.1 was released on December 13, 2003; 21 years ago.

== See also ==
- OpenSSL
- GnuTLS
- Network Security Services
- Libgcrypt
- MatrixSSL
- mbed TLS (previously PolarSSL)
- wolfSSL (previously CyaSSL)
- Comparison of TLS implementations
- Comparison of cryptography libraries
