= Server Name Indication =

TLS extension to serve multiple HTTPS sites

Server Name Indication (SNI) is an extension to Transport Layer Security (TLS) where a client indicates which hostname it is attempting to connect to at the start of the handshaking process. The extension allows a server to present one of multiple possible certificates on the same IP address and port number, allowing for multiple services (including HTTPS websites) to be served by the same IP address without using a single certificate. For HTTPS, it is the conceptual equivalent to HTTP/1.1 virtual hosting. In the original specification, the hostname is not encrypted; the later Encrypted Client Hello specification rectifies this. The SNI extension was specified in 2003 in RFC 3546.

== Background of the problem ==
Prior to SNI, when making a TLS connection, the client had no way to specify which site it was trying to connect to. Hence, if one server hosts multiple sites on a single listener, the server has no way to know which certificate to use in the TLS protocol. In more detail, when making a TLS connection, the client requests a digital certificate from the web server. Once the server sends the certificate, the client examines it and compares the name it was trying to connect to with the name(s) included in the certificate. If a match occurs, the connection proceeds as normal. If a match is not found, the user may be warned of the discrepancy and the connection may abort as the mismatch may indicate an attempted man-in-the-middle attack. However, some applications allow the user to bypass the warning to proceed with the connection, with the user taking on the responsibility of trusting the certificate and, by extension, the connection.

However, it may be hard – or even impossible due to lack of a full list of all names in advance – to obtain a single certificate that covers all names a server will be responsible for. A server that is responsible for multiple hostnames is likely to need to present a different certificate for each name (or small group of names). It is possible to use subjectAltName to contain multiple domains controlled by one person in a single certificate. Such "unified communications certificates" must be reissued every time the list of domains changes.

Name-based virtual hosting allows multiple DNS hostnames to be hosted by a single server (usually a web server) on the same IP address. To achieve this, the server uses a hostname presented by the client as part of the protocol (for HTTP the name is presented in the host header). However, when using HTTPS, the TLS handshake happens before the server sees any HTTP headers. Therefore, it was not possible for the server to use the information in the HTTP host header to decide which certificate to present and as such only names covered by the same certificate could be served from the same IP address.

In practice, this meant that an HTTPS server could only serve one domain (or small group of domains) per IP address for secured and efficient browsing. Assigning a separate IP address for each site increases the cost of hosting, since requests for IP addresses must be justified to the regional Internet registry and IPv4 addresses are now exhausted. For IPv6, it increases the administrative overhead by having multiple IPs on a single machine, even though the address space is not exhausted. The result was that many websites were effectively constrained from using secure communications.

== Technical principles ==
SNI addresses this issue by having the client send the name of the virtual domain as part of the TLS negotiation's ClientHello message. This enables the server to select the correct virtual domain early and present the browser with the certificate containing the correct name. Therefore, with clients and servers that implement SNI, a server with a single IP address can serve a group of domain names for which it is impractical to get a common certificate.

SNI was added to the IETF's Internet RFCs in June 2003 through RFC 3546, Transport Layer Security (TLS) Extensions. The latest version of the standard is RFC 6066.

== Security implications ==
Server Name Indication payload is not encrypted, thus the hostname of the server the client tries to connect to is visible to a passive eavesdropper. This protocol weakness was exploited by security software for network filtering and monitoring and governments to implement censorship.

Presently, there are multiple technologies attempting to hide Server Name Indication:

=== Domain fronting ===
Domain fronting is a technique of replacing the desired host name in SNI with another one hosted by the same server or, more frequently, network of servers known as a content delivery network. When a client uses domain fronting, it replaces the server domain in SNI (unencrypted), but leaves it in the HTTP host header (which is encrypted by TLS) so that server can serve the right content. Domain fronting violates the standard defining SNI itself, so its compatibility is limited (many services check that SNI host matches the HTTP header host and reject connections with domain-fronted SNI as invalid). While domain fronting was used in the past to avoid government censorship, its popularity dwindled because major cloud providers (Google, Amazon's AWS and CloudFront) explicitly prohibit it in their TOS and have technical restrictions against it.

=== Encrypted Client Hello ===
Encrypted Client Hello (ECH) is a TLS 1.3 protocol extension defined in RFC 9849 in March 2026 that enables encryption of the whole Client Hello message, which is sent during the early stage of TLS 1.3 negotiation. ECH encrypts the payload with a public key that the relying party (a web browser) needs to know in advance, which means ECH is most effective with large CDNs. Transmission of the public keys and configuration information via HTTPS and SVCB DNS records is defined in RFC 9848.

The initial 2018 version of this extension was called Encrypted SNI (ESNI). In March 2020, ESNI was reworked into the ECH extension, after analysis demonstrated that encrypting only the SNI is insufficient. For example, specifications permit the Pre-Shared Key extension to contain any data to facilitate session resumption, even transmission of a cleartext copy of exactly the same server name that is encrypted by ESNI. Also, encrypting extensions one-by-one would require an encrypted variant of every extension, each with potential privacy implications, and even that exposes the set of extensions advertised. Lastly, real-world deployment of ESNI has exposed interoperability limitations. The short name was ECHO in March 2020 and changed to ECH in May 2020. In July 2023, in the IETF117 meeting, members working on ECH informed Chrome and Firefox were doing a 1% sample trial, and the team expects the final draft to be submitted to the IESG evaluation by January 2024.

In September 2023, Cloudflare started to support ECH for hosted domains.

In September 2023, Chromium version 117 (used in Google Chrome, Microsoft Edge, Samsung Internet, and Opera) enabled ECH by default, also requiring keys to be deployed in HTTPS resource records in DNS. ECH is enabled in Firefox by default since version 119 released in October 2023, and is recommended by Mozilla to be used along with DNS over HTTPS.

In April 2026, OpenSSL 4.0 included support for ECH. Since its December 2025 release, nginx supports ECH with OpenSSL 4.0.

==== ESNI (2018–2020) ====
The initial 2018 version of this extension was called Encrypted SNI (ESNI) and its implementations were rolled out in an "experimental" fashion to address this risk of domain eavesdropping. In contrast to ECH, Encrypted SNI encrypted just the SNI rather than the whole Client Hello. Opt-in support for this version was incorporated into Firefox in October 2018 and required enabling DNS over HTTPS (DoH). But it was removed in January 2021 with the release of Firefox 85.

Both ESNI and ECH are compatible only with TLS 1.3 because they rely on KeyShareEntry which was first defined in TLS 1.3.

In August 2020, the Great Firewall of China started blocking ESNI traffic, while still allowing ECH traffic.

In October 2020, Russian ISP Rostelecom and its mobile operator Tele2 started blocking ESNI traffic. In September of the same year, Russian censorship ministry Roscomnadzor planned to ban a range of encryption protocols, among which were TLS 1.3 and ESNI, which hindered web site access censorship.

== Implementation ==
In 2004, a patch for adding TLS/SNI into OpenSSL was created by the EdelKey project. In 2006, this patch was then ported to the development branch of OpenSSL, and in 2007 it was back-ported to OpenSSL 0.9.8 (first released in 0.9.8f). First web browsers with SNI support appeared in 2006 (Mozilla Firefox 2.0, Internet Explorer 7), web servers later (Apache HTTP Server in 2009, Microsoft IIS in 2012).

For an application program to implement SNI, the TLS library it uses must implement it and the application must pass the hostname to the TLS library. Further complicating matters, the TLS library may either be included in the application program or be a component of the underlying operating system. Because of this, some browsers implement SNI when running on any operating system, while others implement it only when running on certain operating systems.

== Support ==
Support
		SNI Support			ECH Support	
Software	Type	Supported	Notes	Since	Supported	Notes
Alpine (email client)	IMAP email client	Yes	Since version 2.22	2019-02-18		
Internet Explorer	Web browser	Yes	Since version 7 on Vista (not supported on XP)	2006	No	
Edge	Web browser	Yes	All versions		Yes	Since v105 behind flag
Mozilla Firefox	Web browser	Yes	Since version 2.0	2006	Yes	Introduced in v85 behind flag. Enabled by default in v118 when DoH is enabled.
cURL	Command-line tool and library	Yes	Since version 7.18.1	2008	Partial	
Safari	Web browser	Yes	Not supported on Windows XP		No	
Google Chrome	Web browser	Yes		2010	Yes	Since v105 behind flag.
BlackBerry 10	Web browser	Yes	Supported in all BB10 releases	2013	No	
BlackBerry OS					No	
Barracuda WAF	Reverse Proxy	Yes	Supported since version 7.8	2013		
Barracuda ADC	Load balancer	Yes	Frontend support since version 4.0 and backend support from v5.2	Frontend 2013 / Backend 2015		
Windows Mobile	Web browser		Some time after 6.5		No	
Android browser (discontinued in Android 4.2)	Web browser	Yes	Honeycomb (3.x) for tablets and Ice Cream Sandwich (4.x) for phones	2011	No	
Firefox for Android	Web browser	Yes	Supported for browsing. Sync and other services support SNI only since version 86.		Yes	Introduced in Nightly behind a flag, available by default since v143
wget	Command-line tool	Yes	Since version 1.14	2012		
Nokia Browser for Symbian	Web browser	No			No	
Opera Mobile for Symbian	Web browser	No	Not supported on Series60		No	
Dillo	Web browser	Yes	Since version 3.1	2016		
IBM HTTP Server	Web server	Yes	Since version 9.0.0			
Apache Tomcat	Web server	Yes	Not supported before 8.5 (backport from 9)			
Apache HTTP Server	Web server	Yes	Since version 2.2.12	2009		
Microsoft IIS	Web server	Yes	Since version 8 (part of Windows Server 2012)	2012		
nginx	Web server	Yes	Since version 0.5.23	2007	Yes	Since v1.29.4
Caddy (web server)	Web server	Yes			Yes	
Jetty	Web server	Yes	Since version 9.3.0	2015		
HCL Domino	Web server	Yes	Since version 11.0.1	2020		
HCL Notes	Workflow client	Yes	Since version 14.0	2023		
H2O	Web server	Yes			Yes	
BoringSSL	Library	Yes			Yes	
BSAFE Micro Edition Suite	Library	Yes		Version 5.0		
GnuTLS	Library	Yes			No	Work in progress as July 2023.
LibreSSL	Library	Yes			No	
Mbed TLS	Library	Yes			No	
Mozilla NSS client side	Library	Yes	Since version 3.11.1	2006	Yes	
Mozilla NSS server side	Library	No			No	
OpenSSL	Library	Yes			Yes	Since v4.0.0
Picotls	Library	Yes			Yes	
Rustls	Library	Yes			No	Supports client-side ECH; server-side ECH still todo as of August 2024
SwiftNIO SSL	Library	Yes			No	
wolfSSL	Library	Yes			Yes	Since v5.6.3
4th Dimension	Standard library	No	Not supported in 15.2 or earlier		No	
ColdFusion / Lucee	Standard library	Yes	ColdFusion since Version 10 Update 18, 11 Update 7, Lucee since Version 4.5.1.019, Version 5.0.0.50	2015		
Erlang	Standard library	Yes	Since version r17	2013		
Go	Standard library	Yes	Since version 1.4	2011		Cloudflare/go fork provides support
Java	Standard library	Yes	Since version 1.7	2011		
Perl	Standard library	Yes	Since Net::SSLeay version 1.50 and IO::Socket::SSL version 1.56	2012		
PHP	Standard library	Yes	Since version 5.3	2014		
Python	Standard library	Yes	Supported in 2.x from 2.7.9 and 3.x from 3.2 (in ssl, urllib[2] and httplib modules)	2011 for Python 3.x and 2014 for Python 2.x		
Qt	Standard library	Yes	Since version 4.8	2011		
Ruby	Standard library	Yes	Since version 2.0 (in net/http)	2011		
Hiawatha	Web server	Yes	Since version 8.6	2012	No	Depends on Mbed TLS.
lighttpd	Web server	Yes	Since version 1.4.24	2009	Yes	Since version 1.4.77
HAProxy	Load balancer	Yes	Since version 1.5-dev12	2012	Yes	
OpenBSD httpd	Web server	Yes	Since OpenBSD version 6.1	2017-04-11	No	Depends on OpenSSL.
