= Libssl =

libssl is the name of a shared library file built from the code base of one of several TLS implementation projects:

- OpenSSL
- LibreSSL
- Network Security Services (NSS)
