= XUDA =

XUDA (Xcert Universal Database API) is a library that is used and integrated in many public key infrastructure (PKI) products of different vendors like the KEON CA of RSA LABS.

XUDA is an Application programming interface (API) that enables programmers to develop PKI applications. XUDA is best seen as a toolkit or library of programs that isolates applications from the complexities of PKI. It encapsulates secure database access and strong authentication via public key certificates, and employs SSL–LDAP to query remote databases using certificates presented during an SSL transaction. XUDA was built to use the cryptography of other vendors. This allows vendors to provide customers with the cryptography of their choice, including all PKCS#11 compliant smart cards and hardware tokens.

XCert is a privately held company that developed and delivered digital certificate-based products for securing e-business transactions. In February 2001 the company was acquired by RSA Labs.
