= Digital Signature Standard =

Information security standard

The Digital Signature Standard (DSS) is a Federal Information Processing Standard specifying a suite of algorithms that can be used to generate digital signatures established by the U.S. National Institute of Standards and Technology (NIST) in 1994. Five revisions to the initial specification have been released: FIPS 186-1 in 1998, FIPS 186-2 in 2000, FIPS 186-3 in 2009, FIPS 186-4 in 2013, and FIPS 186-5 in 2023.

== Overview ==
It defines the Digital Signature Algorithm, contains a definition of RSA signatures based on the definitions contained within PKCS #1 version 2.1 and in American National Standard X9.31 with some additional requirements, and contains a definition of the Elliptic Curve Digital Signature Algorithm based on the definition provided by American National Standard X9.62 with some additional requirements and some recommended elliptic curves. It also approves the use of all three algorithms.
