= Keyring (cryptography) =

Cryptography key store

In cryptography, a keyring stores known encryption keys (and, in some cases, passwords). For example, GNU Privacy Guard makes use of keyrings.

== See also ==
- Java KeyStore
