= Java KeyStore =

Software development tool for security

A Java KeyStore (JKS) is a repository of security certificates – either authorization certificates or public key certificates – plus corresponding private keys, used for instance in TLS encryption.

In IBM WebSphere Application Server and Oracle WebLogic Server, a file with extension jks serves as a keystore.

The Java Development Kit maintains a CA keystore file named cacerts in folder jre/lib/security. JDKs provide a tool named keytool to manipulate the keystore. keytool has no functionality to extract the private key out of the keystore, but this is possible with third-party tools like jksExportKey, CERTivity, Portecle and KeyStore Explorer.

== See also ==
- Java Secure Socket Extension
- Keyring (cryptography)
- Public key infrastructure
