= Rustls =

Implementation of TLS in Rust

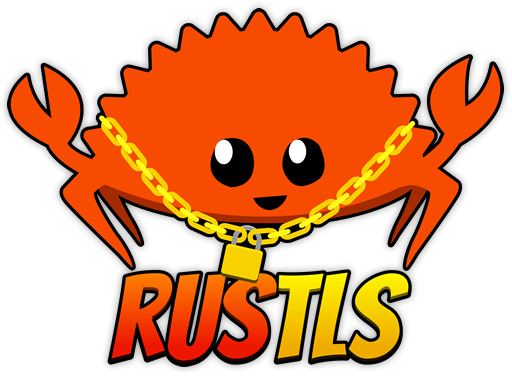
- Developers: Joe Birr-Pixton, Dirkjan Ochtman, Daniel McCarney, Josh Aas
- Release: 2016; 10 years ago
- Stable release: 0.23.42
- Written in: Rust
- Operating system: Cross-platform
- Type: Security library
- License: Apache 2.0, MIT, ISC
- Website: rustls.dev
- Repository: github.com/rustls/rustls

Rustls (pronounced "rustles") is an open-source implementation of the Transport Layer Security (TLS) cryptographic protocol written in the Rust programming language. TLS is essential to internet security, and Rustls aims to enable secure, fast TLS connections. Rustls uses Rust's enforcement of memory safety to reduce the risk of security vulnerabilities. It is part of efforts to improve internet security by replacing memory-unsafe software libraries, such as OpenSSL, with memory-safe alternatives.

== Team and funding ==
Joe Birr-Pixton started Rustls in 2016 and remains the lead developer as of 2024. The Internet Security Research Group (ISRG), a nonprofit organization based in the United States, supported the project from 2021 to 2025 as part of its Prossimo initiative. As of 2025, Rustls is fiscally sponsored by the Rust Innovation Lab at the Rust Foundation. The shared goal is to make Rustls a viable alternative to OpenSSL, which is widely used by internet servers but difficult to use correctly and has had security bugs, such as Heartbleed, caused by memory-unsafe code.

ISRG paid several programmers to work on Rustls, including Birr-Pixton, Daniel McCarney, and Dirkjan Ochtman, using money contributed by Google and other companies and organizations. In 2023, the Open Source Security Foundation's Alpha-Omega initiative gave ISRG $530,000 for development of the option to use different cryptographic backends and for the separate project Rust for Linux. That money came from Google, Amazon Web Services, and Microsoft. Amazon Web Services also gave ISRG $1 million in 2023 for memory-safety projects including Rustls. The Sovereign Tech Fund, supported by the German government, gave $1.5 million to ISRG in 2023 for work on Rustls and other projects that provide memory-safe versions of open source tools critical to internet security. Craig Newmark Philanthropies granted $100,000 to ISRG for memory safety projects in 2024. Additional funding has come from Fly.io, a cloud platform that uses Rustls.

The United States Office of the National Cyber Director has encouraged work on memory-safe security software and complimented the Rustls team. Google awarded Open Source Peer Bonuses to Birr-Pixton and Ochtman for their work on Rustls.

== Architecture and features ==
Rustls is a low-level software library focused on TLS implementation. This means it does not support other internet protocols by itself, such as HTTPS, but software that implements other protocols may use Rustls as a component.

By default Rustls uses cryptographic primitives from Amazon Web Services Libcrypto for Rust (aws-lc-rs), which supports Federal Information Processing Standards (FIPS). Rustls allows using alternative cryptographic libraries instead of aws-lc-rs, such as ring. The project has experimental support for post-quantum cryptography: a key exchange method with a special key encapsulation mechanism (Kyber).

Rustls uses its own fork of the webpki library to verify public key infrastructure certificates, a step in the TLS handshake. Rustls supports Server Name Indication (SNI), which allows a web server to serve multiple HTTPS websites at the same IP address with different certificates. It also supports TLS certificates that contain IP addresses instead of domain names.

C programs can use Rustls through a foreign function interface API, rustls-ffi. For example, cURL is a popular tool written in C, and it allows using Rustls through rustls-ffi. Rustls also has an OpenSSL compatibility layer that allows configuring the widely-used Nginx web server to use Rustls instead of OpenSSL.

Rustls is available under multiple free software licenses: Apache 2.0, MIT, and ISC.

=== Evaluations ===
In 2020, the Cloud Native Computing Foundation funded a security audit of Rustls and two Rust libraries it used, ring and webpki, with positive results.

In 2019, benchmarks carried out by the Rustls developer showed better performance than OpenSSL. In 2024 the project conducted new performance comparisons with the latest version of OpenSSL, which showed some scenarios where Rustls was faster or more efficient and some where OpenSSL performed better.

== Uses ==
Like other TLS implementations, a computer user may use Rustls without being aware of it, as an underlying part of an application or website. A programmer can use Rustls directly or by configuring a higher-level library or tool to use it. In particular, Rustls is used by some projects that want to ensure they have a secure software supply chain. The US Cybersecurity and Infrastructure Security Agency has recommended using products in memory safe languages as part of its "Secure by Design" initiative.

Some libraries support Rustls as one of several choices for TLS implementations. The reqwest HTTP client library offers the option to use Rustls for TLS instead of the system's default TLS library (for example, on Windows the default is the Security Support Provider Interface). In 2020 an ISRG software engineer enabled using Rustls as a TLS backend for cURL. s2n-quic, an implementation of the QUIC network protocol in Rust, supports both Rustls and s2n-tls for TLS.

In 2021 Google funded the creation of mod_tls, a new TLS module for Apache HTTP Server using Rustls. The new module is intended to be a successor to the mod_ssl module that uses OpenSSL, as a more secure default. As of August 2024, mod_tls is available in the latest version of Apache but still marked as experimental. The Internet Society, a nonprofit that advocates for an open and secure internet, suggests that organizations use this module as a step toward increasing memory safety.

Rustls is the default TLS implementation in some applications. The utility program cargo_audit, which checks Rust project dependencies for security vulnerabilities, uses Rustls. Linkerd, which "adds security, observability, and reliability to any Kubernetes cluster", includes a proxy server built with Rustls. Wolfi, a tool for making memory-safe Linux containers, uses Rustls. In 2024, ISRG announced plans to start replacing OpenSSL with Rustls in Let's Encrypt, their free certificate authority used by hundreds of millions of websites.

== See also ==
- Comparison of TLS implementations
