= MatrixSSL =

Open-source TLS/SSL implementation

- Developer: Rambus
- Initial release: January 25, 2004
- Stable release: 4.6.0 / 29 December 2022; 3 years ago
- Repository: github.com/matrixssl/matrixssl
- Written in: C
- Operating system: Multi-platform
- Type: Security library
- License: dual GPLv2 or proprietary
- Website: www.matrixssl.org

MatrixSSL is an open-source TLS/SSL implementation designed for custom applications in embedded hardware environments.

The MatrixSSL library contains a full cryptographic software module that includes industry-standard public key and symmetric key algorithms. It is now called the Inside Secure TLS Toolkit.

== Features ==
Features:

- Protocol versions
  - SSL 3.0
  - TLS 1.0
  - TLS 1.1
  - TLS 1.2
  - TLS 1.3
  - DTLS 1.0
  - DTLS 1.2
- Public key algorithms
  - RSA
  - Elliptic curve cryptography
  - Diffie–Hellman
- Symmetric key algorithms
  - AES
  - AES-GCM
  - Triple DES
  - ChaCha
  - ARC4
  - SEED
- Supported cipher suites
  - TLS_AES_128_GCM_SHA256 (TLS 1.3)
  - TLS_AES_256_GCM_SHA384 (TLS 1.3)
  - TLS_CHACHA20_POLY1305_SHA256 (TLS 1.3)
  - TLS_DHE_RSA_WITH_AES_128_CBC_SHA
  - TLS_DHE_RSA_WITH_AES_256_CBC_SHA
  - TLS_DHE_RSA_WITH_AES_128_CBC_SHA256
  - TLS_DHE_RSA_WITH_AES_256_CBC_SHA256
  - SSL_DHE_RSA_WITH_3DES_EDE_CBC_SHA
  - TLS_RSA_WITH_SEED_CBC_SHA
  - TLS_DHE_PSK_WITH_AES_128_CBC_SHA
  - TLS_DHE_PSK_WITH_AES_256_CBC_SHA
  - TLS_PSK_WITH_AES_128_CBC_SHA
  - TLS_PSK_WITH_AES_256_CBC_SHA
  - TLS_ECDHE_ECDSA_WITH_AES_128_CBC_SHA
  - TLS_ECDHE_ECDSA_WITH_AES_256_CBC_SHA
  - TLS_ECDHE_ECDSA_WITH_AES_128_GCM_SHA256
  - TLS_ECDHE_ECDSA_WITH_AES_256_GCM_SHA384
  - TLS_ECDHE_RSA_WITH_AES_128_CBC_SHA
  - TLS_ECDHE_RSA_WITH_AES_256_CBC_SHA
  - TLS_ECDHE_RSA_WITH_AES_128_CBC_SHA256
  - TLS_ECDHE_RSA_WITH_AES_256_CBC_SHA256
  - TLS_ECDHE_RSA_WITH_AES_128_GCM_SHA256
  - TLS_ECDHE_RSA_WITH_AES_256_GCM_SHA384
  - TLS_ECDH_ECDSA_WITH_AES_128_CBC_SHA
  - TLS_ECDH_ECDSA_WITH_AES_256_CBC_SHA
  - TLS_ECDH_RSA_WITH_AES_128_CBC_SHA
  - TLS_ECDH_RSA_WITH_AES_256_CBC_SHA
  - TLS_ECDH_ECDSA_WITH_AES_128_CBC_SHA256
  - TLS_ECDHE_ECDSA_WITH_AES_128_CBC_SHA256
  - TLS_RSA_WITH_AES_128_CBC_SHA
  - TLS_RSA_WITH_AES_256_CBC_SHA
  - TLS_RSA_WITH_AES_128_CBC_SHA256
  - TLS_RSA_WITH_AES_256_CBC_SHA256
  - TLS_RSA_WITH_AES_128_GCM_SHA256
  - TLS_RSA_WITH_AES_256_GCM_SHA384
  - SSL_RSA_WITH_3DES_EDE_CBC_SHA
  - SSL_RSA_WITH_RC4_128_SHA
  - SSL_RSA_WITH_RC4_128_MD5
  - TLS_DH_anon_WITH_AES_128_CBC_SHA
  - TLS_DH_anon_WITH_AES_256_CBC_SHA
  - SSL_DH_anon_WITH_3DES_EDE_CBC_SHA
  - SSL_DH_anon_WITH_RC4_128_MD5
- Client authentication
- Secure Renegotiation
- Standard Session Resumption
- Stateless Session Resumption
- Transport independent
- PKCS#1 and PKCS#8 key parsing
- False Start
- Max Fragment Length extension
- Optional PKCS#11 Crypto Interface

== Major Releases ==
Version	Date
4.0.0	Sep 2018
3.9.0	Mar 2017
3.8.3	Apr 2016
3.7.1	Dec 2014
3.6	Apr 2014
3.4	Jan 2013
3.3	Feb 2012
3.2	Jun 2011
3.1	Mar 2010
3.0	Aug 2009
2.2	Jan 2008
2.1	Nov 2005
1.7	Apr 2005
1.1	May 2004
1.0	Jan 2004

== See also ==
- Comparison of TLS implementations
- GnuTLS
- wolfSSL
