= Mbed TLS =

Free software library implementing TLS

- Developer: Collaborative project managed by TrustedFirmware (formerly by Arm)
- Initial release: January 15, 2009
- Stable release: 4.1.0 (31 March 2026; 29 days ago) [±]
- Written in: C
- Operating system: Multi-platform
- Type: Security library
- License: Dual Apache-2.0 or GPL-2.0-or-later
- Website: www.trustedfirmware.org/projects/mbed-tls/
- Repository: github.com/Mbed-TLS/mbedtls

Mbed TLS (previously PolarSSL) is an implementation of the TLS and SSL protocols and the respective cryptographic algorithms and support code required. It is distributed under the Apache License version 2.0. Stated on the website is that Mbed TLS aims to be "easy to understand, use, integrate and expand".

== History ==
The PolarSSL SSL library is the official continuation fork of the XySSL SSL library. XySSL was created by the French "white hat hacker" Christophe Devine and was first released on November 1, 2006, under GNU GPL v2 and BSD licenses. In 2008, Christophe Devine was no longer able to support XySSL and allowed Paul Bakker to create the official fork, named PolarSSL. In November 2014, PolarSSL was acquired by ARM Holdings.

In 2011, the Dutch government approved an integration between OpenVPN and PolarSSL, which is named OpenVPN-NL. This version of OpenVPN has been approved for use in protecting government communications up to the level of Restricted.

As of the release of version 1.3.10, PolarSSL has been rebranded to Mbed TLS to better show its fit inside the Mbed ecosystem. Starting from version 2.1.0, the library was made available under both the GPL v2 and Apache License v2.0.

In 2020, Mbed TLS joined the TrustedFirmware project.

== Library ==
The core SSL library is written in the C programming language and implements the SSL module, the basic cryptographic functions and provides various utility functions. Unlike OpenSSL and other implementations of TLS, Mbed TLS is like wolfSSL in that it is designed to fit on small embedded devices, with the minimum complete TLS stack requiring under 60KB of program space and under 64 KB of RAM. It is also highly modular: each component, such as a cryptographic function, can be used independently from the rest of the framework. Versions are also available for Microsoft Windows and Linux. Because Mbed TLS is written in the C programming language, without external dependencies, it works on most operating systems and architectures.

Since version 1.3.0, it has abstraction layers for memory allocation and threading to the core "to support better integration with existing embedded operating systems".

=== Design priorities ===
The Mbed TLS library expresses a focus on readability of the code, documentation, automated regression tests, a loosely coupled design and portable code.

=== Development documentation ===
The following documentation is available for developers:

- High Level Design: a high level description of the different modules inside the library, with UML diagrams, use cases and interactions in common scenarios.
- API documentation: Doxygen-generated documentation from the header files of the library.
- Source code documentation: The source code of the library is documented to clarify structures, decisions and code constructs.

=== Automated testing ===
The automated testing of Mbed TLS includes:

- A test framework is included with the source code that contains over 5000 automated tests (based on the number of tests in version 1.3.2 of the library) to test for regressions and compatibility on different platforms.
- A compatibility script (compat.sh) that tests compatibility of SSL communication with OpenSSL and GnuTLS.
- A continuous integration system based on Travis CI and Jenkins.

== Use ==
Mbed TLS is used as the SSL component in large open source projects:

- OpenVPN and OpenVPN-NL
- Hiawatha
- PowerDNS
- OpenWRT

== Platforms ==
Mbed TLS is currently available for most Operating Systems including Linux, Microsoft Windows, OS X, OpenWrt, Android, iOS, RISC OS and FreeRTOS. Chipsets supported at least include ARM, x86, PowerPC, MIPS.

== Algorithms ==
Mbed TLS supports a number of different cryptographic algorithms:

Cryptographic hash functions
MD2, MD4, MD5, RIPEMD160, SHA-1, SHA-2, SHA-3
MAC modes
CMAC, HMAC
Ciphers
AES, ARIA, Blowfish, Camellia, ChaCha, DES, RC4, Triple DES, XTEA
Cipher modes
ECB, CBC, CFB, CTR, OFB, XTS
Authenticated encryption modes
CCM, GCM, NIST Key Wrap,
ChaCha20-Poly1305
Key derivation
HKDF
Key stretching
PBKDF2, PKCS #5 PBE2, PKCS #12 key derivation
Public-key cryptography
RSA, Diffie–Hellman key exchange,
Elliptic curve cryptography (ECC), Elliptic curve Diffie–Hellman (ECDH), Elliptic Curve DSA (ECDSA), Elliptic curve J-PAKE

== See also ==
- Transport Layer Security
- Comparison of TLS implementations
- POSSE project
- GnuTLS
- Network Security Services
- wolfSSL (previously CyaSSL)
- MatrixSSL
- OpenSSL
