= Java Secure Socket Extension =

Java application programming interface

In computing, the Java Secure Socket Extension (JSSE) is a Java API and a provider implementation named SunJSSE that enable secure Internet communications in the Java Runtime Environment. It implements a Java technology version of the Secure Sockets Layer (SSL) and the Transport Layer Security (TLS) protocols. It includes functionality for data encryption, server authentication, message integrity, and optional client-authentication.

JSSE was originally developed as an optional package for Java versions 1.2 and 1.3, but was added as a standard API and implementation into JDK 1.4.

== See also ==
- Java KeyStore
