= GnuTLS =

Free software library implementing TLS

- Developers: Nikos Mavrogiannopoulos, Simon Josefsson
- Stable release: 3.8.13 / 29 April 2026; 22 days ago
- Written in: C, Assembly
- Operating system: Linux, macOS, Windows, BSD
- Platform: x86, x86-64, ARM
- Type: Cryptography library
- License: LGPL-2.1-or-later
- Website: www.gnutls.org
- Repository: gitlab.com/gnutls/gnutls.git

GnuTLS (/ˈɡnuː ˌtiː ˌɛl ˈɛs/, the GNU Transport Layer Security Library) is a free software implementation of the TLS, SSL and DTLS protocols. It offers an application programming interface (API) for applications to enable secure communication over the network transport layer, as well as interfaces to access X.509, PKCS #12, OpenPGP and other structures.

== Features ==
GnuTLS consists of a library that allows client applications to start secure sessions using the available protocols. It also provides command-line tools, including an X.509 certificate manager, a test client and server, and random key and password generators.

GnuTLS has the following features:

- TLS 1.3, TLS 1.2, TLS 1.1, TLS 1.0, and SSL 3.0 protocols
- Datagram TLS (DTLS) 1.2, and DTLS 1.0, protocols
- TLS-SRP: Secure remote password protocol (SRP) for TLS authentication
- TLS-PSK: Pre-shared key (PSK) for TLS authentication
- X.509 and OpenPGP certificate handling
- CPU assisted cryptography and cryptographic accelerator support (/dev/crypto), VIA PadLock and AES-NI instruction sets
- Support for smart cards and for hardware security modules
- Storage of cryptographic keys in the system's Trusted Platform Module (TPM)

== History ==
=== Origin ===
GnuTLS was initially created around March to November 2000, by Nikos Mavrogiannopoulos to allow applications of the GNU Project to use secure protocols such as TLS. Although OpenSSL already existed, OpenSSL's license is not compatible with the GPL; thus software under the GPL, such as GNU software, could not use OpenSSL without making a GPL linking exception.

=== License ===
The GnuTLS library was licensed originally under the GNU Lesser General Public License v2, while included applications to use the GNU General Public License.

In August 2011 the library was updated to the LGPLv3. After it was noticed that there were new license compatibility problems introduced, especially with other free software with the license change, after discussions the license was downgraded again to LGPLv2.1 in March 2013.

=== Split from GNU ===
GnuTLS was created for the GNU Project, but in December 2012 its maintainer, Nikos Mavrogiannopoulos, dissociated the project from GNU after policy disputes with the Free Software Foundation. Richard Stallman opposed this move and suggested forking the project instead. Soon afterward, developer Paolo Bonzini ended his maintainership of GNU Sed and Grep, expressing concerns similar to those of GnuTLS maintainer Mavrogiannopoulos.

== Deployment ==
Software packages using GnuTLS include(d):

- GNOME
- CenterIM
- Exim
- WeeChat
- Mutt
- Wireshark
- slrn
- Lynx
- CUPS
- gnoMint
- GNU Emacs
- Synology DiskStation Manager
- OpenConnect

== See also ==
- Comparison of TLS implementations
- wolfSSL (previously CyaSSL)
- mbed TLS (previously PolarSSL)
- List of free and open-source software packages
- Network Security Services
