= IAIK-JCE =

- Stable release: 5.63 / December 24, 2021
- Written in: Java
- Operating system: cross-platform
- Type: cryptography API
- License: Proprietary software
- Website: jce.iaik.tugraz.at

IAIK-JCE is a Java-based Cryptographic Service Provider, which is being developed at the Institute for Applied Information Processing and Communications (IAIK) at the Graz University of Technology. It offers support for many commonly used cryptographic algorithms, such as hash functions, message authentication codes, symmetric, asymmetric, stream and block encryption. Its development started in 1996 and as such IAIK-JCE was one of the first Java-based cryptography providers. It is written entirely in Java and based on the same design principles as Oracle's JCA/JCE.

== License ==
Next to a commercial license, IAIK-JCE can also be obtained freely for academic purposes, evaluation and open-source development.

== See also ==
- Java Cryptography Architecture
- Java Cryptography Extension
