= MMH =

MMH may refer to:

- Monomethylhydrazine, CH_{3}N_{2}H_{3}, a chemical
- Mammoth Yosemite Airport. IATA code
- Mackay Memorial Hospital, Taipei, Taiwan
- Multilinear Modular Hashing, a computer algorithm
- Manual material handling
- Mark McHugh, a Gaelic footballer
- Martin McHugh (Gaelic footballer), a Gaelic footballer
