= Provider =

Provider may refer to:

- A supplier
- Health care provider, an individual or institution that provides health care services
- Internet service provider, a business or organization that offers access to the Internet and related services
- Provider model, a design pattern originally developed by Microsoft for use in the .NET framework
- A euphemism for prostitute, most often referring to high-end sex workers who do not display their profession to the general public
- A breadwinner of a family
- C-123 Provider, an American military transport aircraft
- "Provider" (Angel), a 2002 episode of the television series Angel
- "Provider", a song by Days of the New from their 1999 album Days of a New
- "Provider" (N.E.R.D. song), 2001
- "Provider", a song by IQ from their 1997 concept album Subterranea
- Providers (music producers), a Danish music production duo made up of Jeppe Federspiel and Rasmus Stabell
- "Provider" (Frank Ocean song), 2017
- "Provider", a song by Sleep Token from their 2025 album Even in Arcadia
