= Walter Tuchman =

Walter Tuchman led the Data Encryption Standard development team at IBM. He was also responsible for the development of Triple DES.

In 1992 he received the US National Institute of Standards and Technology and National Security Agency's National Computer Systems Security Award.

== See also ==
- Horst Feistel
