= Internet Mail 2000 =

Internet mail architecture

Internet Mail 2000 is an Internet mail architecture proposed by Daniel J. Bernstein (and in subsequent years separately proposed by several others), designed with the precept that the initial storage of mail messages be the responsibility of the sender, and not of the recipient as it is with the SMTP-based Internet mail architecture.

Whereas the SMTP-based Internet mail architecture has a close analogue in the architecture of paper mail, this is not the case for Internet Mail 2000. Its architecture depends on various things that are unique to the natures of the Internet and to electronic messages. One of its goals is to reduce spam.

== Implementations ==
Over the years since Daniel J. Bernstein proposed it, several attempts have been made to design and to implement a real Internet Mail 2000 system, with varying degrees of achievement. The closest thing to a concrete, open implementation of the system is Meng Weng Wong's StubMail, which was presented at Google in July 2006.

== See also ==
Bernstein has also suggested the Quick Mail Transfer Protocol (QMTP).
