= Java Cryptography Architecture =

In computing, the Java Cryptography Architecture (JCA) is a framework for working with cryptography using the Java programming language. It forms part of the Java security API, and was first introduced in JDK 1.1 in the java.security package.

The JCA uses a "provider"-based architecture and contains a set of APIs for various purposes, such as encryption, key generation and management, secure random-number generation, certificate validation, etc. These APIs provide an easy way for developers to integrate security into application code.

== See also ==
- Java Cryptography Extension
- Bouncy Castle (cryptography)
