= Poly1305 =

Universal hash family used for message authentication in cryptography

Poly1305 is a universal hash family designed by Daniel J. Bernstein in 2002 for use in cryptography.

As with any universal hash family, Poly1305 can be used as a one-time message authentication code to authenticate a single message using a secret key shared between sender and recipient, similar to the way that a one-time pad can be used to conceal the content of a single message using a secret key shared between sender and recipient.

Originally Poly1305 was proposed as part of Poly1305-AES, a Carter–Wegman authenticator that combines the Poly1305 hash with AES-128 to authenticate many messages using a single short key and distinct message numbers. Poly1305 was later applied with a single-use key generated for each message using XSalsa20 in the NaCl crypto_secretbox_xsalsa20poly1305 authenticated cipher, and then using ChaCha in the ChaCha20-Poly1305 authenticated cipher deployed in TLS on the internet.

== Description ==
=== Definition of Poly1305 ===
Poly1305 takes a 16-byte secret key $r$ and an $L$-byte message $m$ and returns a 16-byte hash $\operatorname{Poly1305}_r(m)$.

Steps:

1. Interpret $r$ as a 16-byte little-endian integer.
2. Break the message $m$ of bytes $m[0], m[1], m[2], \dotsc, m[L - 1]$ into consecutive 16-byte chunks, possibly with a partial final chunk of fewer than 16 bytes.
3. Append a 0x01 byte to each chunk and interpret it as an integer; take the integers as the coefficients of a polynomial.
4. Evaluate the polynomial at the point $r$ modulo the prime $2^{130} - 5$.
5. Reduce the result modulo $2^{128}$ encoded in little-endian return a 16-byte hash.

The coefficients $c_i$ of the polynomial $c_1 r^q + c_2 r^{q - 1} + \cdots + c_q r$, where $q = \lceil L/16\rceil$, are:

$$c_i = m[16i - 16] + 2^8 m[16i - 15] + 2^{16} m[16i - 14] + \cdots + 2^{120} m[16i - 1] + 2^{128},$$

with the exception that, if $L \not\equiv 0 \pmod{16}$, then:

$$c_q = m[16q - 16] + 2^8 m[16q - 15] + \cdots + 2^{8(L \bmod 16) - 8} m[L - 1] + 2^{8 (L \bmod 16)}.$$

The secret key $r = (r[0], r[1], r[2], \dotsc, r[15])$ is restricted to have the bytes $r[3], r[7], r[11], r[15] \in \{0,1,2,\dotsc,15\}$, i.e., to have their top four bits clear; and to have the bytes $r[4], r[8], r[12] \in \{0,4,8,\dotsc,252\}$, i.e., to have their bottom two bits clear. Thus there are $2^{106}$ distinct possible values of $r$.

=== Use as a one-time authenticator ===
If $s$ is a secret 16-byte string interpreted as a little-endian integer, then

$$a := \bigl(\operatorname{Poly1305}_r(m) + s\bigr) \bmod 2^{128}$$

is called the authenticator for the message $m$. If a sender and recipient share the 32-byte secret key $(r, s)$ in advance, chosen uniformly at random, then the sender can transmit an authenticated message $(a, m)$. When the recipient receives an alleged authenticated message $(a', m')$ (which may have been modified in transmit by an adversary), they can verify its authenticity by testing whether

$$a' \mathrel{\stackrel?=} \bigl(\operatorname{Poly1305}_r(m') + s\bigr) \bmod 2^{128}.$$
Without knowledge of $(r, s)$, the adversary has probability $8\lceil L/16\rceil/2^{106}$ of finding any $(a', m') \ne (a, m)$ that will pass verification.

However, the same key $(r, s)$ must not be reused for two messages. If the adversary learns

$$\begin{align}
a_1 &= \bigl(\operatorname{Poly1305}_r(m_1) + s\bigr) \bmod 2^{128}, \\
a_2 &= \bigl(\operatorname{Poly1305}_r(m_2) + s\bigr) \bmod 2^{128},
\end{align}$$

for $m_1 \ne m_2$, they can subtract

$$a_1 - a_2 \equiv \operatorname{Poly1305}_r(m_1) - \operatorname{Poly1305}_r(m_2) \pmod{2^{128}}$$

and find a root of the resulting polynomial to recover a small list of candidates for the secret evaluation point $r$, and from that the secret pad $s$. The adversary can then use this to forge additional messages with high probability.

=== Use in Poly1305-AES as a Carter–Wegman authenticator ===
The original Poly1305-AES proposal uses the Carter–Wegman structure to authenticate many messages by taking $a_i := H_r(m_i) + p_i$ to be the authenticator on the ith message $m_i$, where $H_r$ is a universal hash family and $p_i$ is an independent uniform random hash value that serves as a one-time pad to conceal it. Poly1305-AES uses AES-128 to generate $p_i := \operatorname{AES}_k(i)$, where $i$ is encoded as a 16-byte little-endian integer.

Specifically, a Poly1305-AES key is a 32-byte pair $(r, k)$ of a 16-byte evaluation point $r$, as above, and a 16-byte AES key $k$. The Poly1305-AES authenticator on a message $m_i$ is

$$a_i := \bigl(\operatorname{Poly1305}_r(m_i) + \operatorname{AES}_k(i)\bigr) \bmod 2^{128},$$

where 16-byte strings and integers are identified by little-endian encoding. Note that $r$ is reused between messages.

Without knowledge of $(r, k)$, the adversary has low probability of forging any authenticated messages that the recipient will accept as genuine. Suppose the adversary sees $C$ authenticated messages and attempts $D$ forgeries, and can distinguish $\operatorname{AES}_k$ from a uniform random permutation with advantage at most $\delta$. (Unless AES is broken, $\delta$ is very small.) The adversary's chance of success at a single forgery is at most:

$$\delta + \frac{(1 - C/2^{128})^{-(C + 1)/2} \cdot 8 D \lceil L/16\rceil}{2^{106}}.$$

The message number $i$ must never be repeated with the same key $(r, k)$. If it is, the adversary can recover a small list of candidates for $r$ and $\operatorname{AES}_k(i)$, as with the one-time authenticator, and use that to forge messages.

=== Use in NaCl and ChaCha20-Poly1305 ===
The NaCl crypto_secretbox_xsalsa20poly1305 authenticated cipher uses a message number $i$ with the XSalsa20 stream cipher to generate a per-message key stream, the first 32 bytes of which are taken as a one-time Poly1305 key $(r_i, s_i)$ and the rest of which is used for encrypting the message. It then uses Poly1305 as a one-time authenticator for the ciphertext of the message.

ChaCha20-Poly1305 uses the first 32 bytes of the ChaCha stream cipher output to generate a one-time Poly1305 key, discards the next 32 bytes, and uses the rest to encrypt the message. XChaCha20-Poly1305 using XChaCha instead of ChaCha or XSalsa20 has also been described.

== Security ==
The security of Poly1305 and its derivatives against forgery follows from its bounded difference probability as a universal hash family: If $m_1$ and $m_2$ are messages of up to $L$ bytes each, and $d$ is any 16-byte string interpreted as a little-endian integer, then

$$\Pr[\operatorname{Poly1305}_r(m_1) - \operatorname{Poly1305}_r(m_2) \equiv d \pmod{2^{128}}]
\leq \frac{8\lceil L/16\rceil}{2^{106}},$$

where $r$ is a uniform random Poly1305 key.

This property is sometimes called $\epsilon$-almost-Δ-universality over $\mathbb Z/2^{128}\mathbb Z$, or $\epsilon$-AΔU, where $\epsilon = 8\lceil L/16\rceil/2^{106}$ in this case.

=== Of one-time authenticator ===
With a one-time authenticator $a = \bigl(\operatorname{Poly1305}_r(m) + s\bigr) \bmod 2^{128}$, the adversary's success probability for any forgery attempt $(a', m')$ on a message $m'$ of up to $L$ bytes is:

$$\begin{align}
\Pr[&a' = \operatorname{Poly1305}_r(m') + s
\mathrel\mid a = \operatorname{Poly1305}_r(m) + s] \\
&= \Pr[a' = \operatorname{Poly1305}_r(m') + a - \operatorname{Poly1305}_r(m)] \\
&= \Pr[\operatorname{Poly1305}_r(m') - \operatorname{Poly1305}_r(m) = a' - a] \\
&\leq 8\lceil L/16\rceil/2^{106}.
\end{align}$$

Here arithmetic inside the $\Pr[\cdots]$ is taken to be in $\mathbb Z/2^{128}\mathbb Z$ for simplicity.

=== Of NaCl and ChaCha20-Poly1305 ===
For NaCl crypto_secretbox_xsalsa20poly1305 and ChaCha20-Poly1305, the adversary's success probability at forgery is the same for each message independently as for a one-time authenticator, plus the adversary's distinguishing advantage $\delta$ against XSalsa20 or ChaCha as pseudorandom functions used to generate the per-message key. In other words, the probability that the adversary succeeds at a single forgery after $D$ attempts of messages up to $L$ bytes is at most:

$$\delta + \frac{8D \lceil L/16\rceil}{2^{106}}.$$

=== Of Poly1305-AES ===
The security of Poly1305-AES against forgery follows from the Carter–Wegman–Shoup structure, which instantiates a Carter–Wegman authenticator with a permutation to generate the per-message pad. If an adversary sees $C$ authenticated messages and attempts $D$ forgeries of messages of up to $L$ bytes, and if the adversary has distinguishing advantage at most $\delta$ against AES-128 as a pseudorandom permutation, then the probability the adversary succeeds at any one of the $D$ forgeries is at most:

$$\delta + \frac{(1 - C/2^{128})^{-(C + 1)/2} \cdot 8 D \lceil L/16\rceil}{2^{106}}.$$

For instance, assuming that messages are packets up to 1024 bytes; that the attacker sees 2^{64} messages authenticated under a Poly1305-AES key; that the attacker attempts a whopping 2^{75} forgeries; and that the attacker cannot break AES with probability above δ; then, with probability at least 0.999999 − δ, all the 2^{75} are rejected

— Bernstein, Daniel J. (2005)

== Speed ==
Poly1305-AES can be computed at high speed in various CPUs: for an n-byte message, no more than 3.1n + 780 Athlon cycles are needed, for example. The author has released optimized source code for Athlon, Pentium Pro/II/III/M, PowerPC, and UltraSPARC, in addition to non-optimized reference implementations in C and C++ as public domain software.

== Implementations ==
Below is a list of cryptography libraries that support Poly1305:

- Botan
- Bouncy Castle
- Crypto++
- Libgcrypt
- libsodium
- Nettle
- OpenSSL
- LibreSSL
- wolfCrypt
- GnuTLS
- mbed TLS
- MatrixSSL

== See also ==
- ChaCha20-Poly1305 – an AEAD scheme combining the stream cipher ChaCha20 with a variant of Poly1305
