= Bouncy Castle (cryptography) =

Cryptographic application programming interface

- Developer: Legion of the Bouncy Castle Inc.

Stable release(s) [±]
- Java: 1.83 / November 27, 2025; 5 months ago
- Java LTS: BC-LJA 2.73.9 / September 19, 2025; 8 months ago
- Java FIPS: BC-FJA 2.0.0 / July 30, 2024; 21 months ago
- C#: 2.6.2 / July 15, 2025; 10 months ago
- C# FIPS: BC-FNA 1.0.2 / March 11, 2024; 2 years ago
- Written in: C# and Java
- Platform: .NET Framework and Java SE
- Type: Cryptography API
- License: MIT License
- Website: bouncycastle.org
- Repository: github.com/bcgit/

Bouncy Castle is a collection of APIs used for implementing cryptography in computer programs. It includes APIs for both the Java and the C# programming languages. The APIs are supported by a registered Australian charitable organization: Legion of the Bouncy Castle Inc.

Bouncy Castle is Australian in origin and therefore American restrictions on the export of cryptography from the United States do not apply to it.

== History ==
Bouncy Castle started when two colleagues were tired of having to re-invent a set of cryptography libraries each time they changed jobs working in server-side Java SE. One of the developers was active in Java ME (J2ME at that time) development as a hobby and a design consideration was to include the greatest range of Java VMs for the library, including those on J2ME. This design consideration led to the architecture that exists in Bouncy Castle.

The project, founded in May 2000, was originally written in Java only, but added a C# API in 2004. The original Java API consisted of approximately 27,000 lines of code, including test code and provided support for J2ME, a JCE/JCA provider, and basic X.509 certificate generation. In comparison, the 1.53 release consists of 390,640 lines of code, including test code. It supports the same functionality as the original release with a larger number of algorithms, plus PKCS#10, PKCS#12, CMS, S/MIME, OpenPGP, DTLS, TLS, OCSP, TSP, CMP, CRMF, DVCS, DANE, EST and Attribute Certificates. The C# API is around 145,000 lines of code and supports most of what the Java API does.

Some key properties of the project are:

- Strong emphasis on standards compliance and adaptability.
- Public support facilities include an issue tracker, dev mailing list and a wiki all available on the website.
- Commercial support provided under resources for the relevant API listed on the Bouncy Castle website

On 18 October 2013, a not-for-profit association, the Legion of the Bouncy Castle Inc. was established in the state of Victoria, Australia, by the core developers and others to take ownership of the project and support the ongoing development of the APIs. The association was recognised as an Australian charity with a purpose of advancement in education and a purpose that is beneficial to the community by the Australian Charities and Not-For-Profits Commission on 7 November 2013. The association was authorised to fundraise to support its purposes on 29 November 2013 by Consumer Affairs Victoria.

== Architecture ==
The Bouncy Castle architecture consists of two main components that support the base cryptographic capabilities. These are known as the 'light-weight' API, and the Java Cryptography Extension (JCE) provider. Further components built upon the JCE provider support additional functionality, such as PGP support, S/MIME, etc.

The low-level, or 'light-weight', API is a set of APIs that implement all the underlying cryptographic algorithms. The APIs were designed to be simple enough to use if needed, but provided the basic building blocks for the JCE provider. The intent is to use the low-level API in memory constrained devices (JavaME) or when easy access to the JCE libraries is not possible (such as distribution in an applet). As the light-weight API is just Java code, the Java virtual machine (JVM) does not impose any restrictions on the operation of the code, and at early times of the Bouncy Castle history it was the only way to develop strong cryptography that was not crippled by the Jurisdiction Policy files that prevented JCE providers from performing "strong" encryption.

The JCE-compatible provider is built upon the low-level APIs. As such, the source code for the JCE provider is an example of how to implement many of the "common" crypto problems using the low-level API. Many projects have been built using the JCE provider, including an Open Source Certificate Authority EJBCA.

== Certified releases ==
The C# and Java releases have FIPS 140-2 Level 1 and FIPS 140-3 Level 1 certified streams as well. These differ from the regular releases in that, while the modules are designed in a similar fashion to the regular releases, the low-level APIs are quite different – largely to support the enforcement of controls that FIPS requires when an algorithm is used. In the case of the JCE level of the Java API, the provider is still largely a drop-in replacement for the regular release. The first FIPS-certified releases were first made available in November 2016, with the latest Java version being assigned certification number 4743 and the latest C# version being assigned certification number 4416.

== Spongy Castle ==
The Android operating system, as of early 2014, includes a customized version of Bouncy Castle. Due to class name conflicts, this prevents Android applications from including and using the official release of Bouncy Castle as-is. A third-party project called Spongy Castle distributes a renamed version of the library to work around this issue.

== Stripy Castle ==
Originally, it was assumed a FIPS 140-2 version of Spongy Castle could also be done. It turned out due to Android's DEX file processing that for FIPS purposes the provider needs to be installed on the device separate from the application. The FIPS 140-2 release for Android is now called Stripy Castle and is packaged under org.stripycastle. This was needed in order to avoid clashes with Android's version of Bouncy Castle as well as clashes for applications that might be using Spongy Castle and not requiring FIPS 140-2 certified services.

== See also ==
- Comparison of cryptography libraries
