= Botan (programming library) =

Cryptographic library written in C++

- Original author: Jack Lloyd
- Release: 2000
- Stable release: 3.11.0 (March 15, 2026; 4 months ago) [±]
- Written in: C++
- Type: Application programming interface (API)
- License: Simplified BSD
- Website: botan.randombit.net
- Repository: github.com/randombit/botan

Botan is a BSD-licensed cryptographic and TLS library written in C++. It provides a wide variety of cryptographic algorithms, formats, and protocols, e.g. SSL and TLS. It is used in the Monotone distributed revision control program, the OpenDNSSEC system, and ISC's Kea DHCP server among other projects.

The project was originally called OpenCL, a name now used by Apple Inc. and Khronos Group for a heterogeneous system programming framework. It was renamed Botan in 2002.

In 2007, the German Federal Office for Information Security contracted FlexSecure GmbH to add an implementation of Card Verifiable Certificates for ePassports to Botan; the modified version of Botan was released under the name InSiTo.

Starting in 2015, the German Federal Office for Information Security funded a project, which included improving the documentation, test suite and feature set of Botan, culminating in 2017, when it was evaluated and recommended as a library suitable for "applications with increased security requirements".

== See also ==
- Comparison of cryptography libraries
