= Poodle (disambiguation) =

A Poodle is a popular dog breed.

Poodle may also refer to:

- POODLE, a computer security vulnerability
- The Poodles, a Swedish heavy metal band
