= Lucky Thirteen =

Lucky Thirteen or Lucky 13 may refer to:

== Film and television ==
- Lucky 13, a 2005 romantic comedy film
- Lucky 13 (TV series), a 2024 American game show on ABC
- "Lucky 13" (All Grown Up!), a 2004 episode of the Nickelodeon animated television series
- "Lucky Thirteen" (House), a 2008 episode of the Fox television drama House
- Lucky, Lucky Thirteen!, a 1980 episode of the ITV drama Lady Killers
- "Lucky 13", a 2019 episode of the Netflix series Love, Death & Robots

== Music ==
- Lucky Thirteen (Bert Jansch album), 1966
- Lucky Thirteen (Neil Young album), 1993
- Lucky 13, a 2000 album by Canadian singer Thomas Wade
- Lucky 13, a 2006 album by Australian blues musician Fiona Boyes
- Lucky Thirteen (Vincent album), 2007
- Lucky 13, a 2012 album by American jazz saxophonist Javon Jackson
- "Lucky Thirteen", a 1956 song by British singer Frankie Vaughan
- "Lucky 13", a song by The Smashing Pumpkins on the 2000 album Machina II/The Friends & Enemies of Modern Music
- "Lucky Thirteen", a song by Cosa Brava on the 2008 album Ragged Atlas

== Radio stations ==
- KAGT (90.5 FM), Abilene, Texas
- WAVZ (1300 AM), New Haven, Connecticut
- WLQY (1320 AM), Hollywood, Florida
- WMID (1340 AM), Atlantic City, New Jersey
- WNQM (1300 AM), Nashville, Tennessee
- WTLC (AM) (1310 AM), Indianapolis, Indiana

== Other uses ==
- Lucky 13 (wrestler), ring name of American professional wrestler Kevin J. Papics
- Lucky Thirteen attack, a padding oracle attack against the TLS protocol
- MFC 13: Lucky 13, a 2007 Maximum Fighting Championship event
- Lucky Thirteen, a photographic series by photographer Philip-Lorca diCorcia
- Lucky 13, a fishing lure considered to be the first modern plug
