= Key ring file =

A key ring is a file which contains multiple public keys of certificate authority (CA).

A key ring is a file which is necessary for Secure Sockets Layer (SSL) connection over the web. It is securely stored on the server which hosts the website. It contains the public/private key pair for the particular website. It also contains the public/private key pairs from various certificate authorities and the trusted root certificates for the various certification authorities.

An entity or website administrator has to send a certificate signing request (CSR) to the CA. The CA then returns a signed certificate to the entity. This certificate received from the CA has to be stored in the key ring.
