= HKDF =

Key derivation function based on an HMAC

HKDF is a multi-purpose key derivation function (KDF) based on the HMAC message authentication code. HKDF follows "extract-then-expand" paradigm, where the KDF logically consists of two modules: the first stage takes the input keying material and "extracts" from it a fixed-length pseudorandom key, and then the second stage "expands" this key into several additional, independent pseudorandom keys as the output of the KDF.

== Mechanism ==
HKDF is the composition of two functions, HKDF-Extract and HKDF-Expand:

$$\operatorname{HKDF}(\mathit{salt}, \mathit{IKM}, \mathit{info}, L)
=
\operatorname{HKDF{-}Expand}
\!\left(
\operatorname{HKDF{-}Extract}(\mathit{salt}, \mathit{IKM}),
\mathit{info},
L
\right)$$

=== HKDF-Extract ===
HKDF-Extract ($\mathrm{XTR}$) takes "input key material" or "source key material" ($\mathrm{IKM}$ or $\mathrm{SKM}$) such as a shared secret generated using Diffie-Hellman; an optional, non-secret, random or pseudorandom salt ($r$); and generates a cryptographic key called the $\mathrm{PRK}$ ("pseudorandom key"). HKDF-Extract acts as a "randomness extractor", (Note: In complexity theory, informally, an extractor maps input probability distributions with sufficient entropy into output distributions that are statistically close to uniform.) specifically a "computational extractor", taking a potentially non-uniform value of sufficient min-entropy and generating a value indistinguishable from a uniform random value (pseudorandom). Computational extractors assume attackers are computationally bounded and source entropy may only exist in a computational sense. Such extractors can be built using cryptographic functions under suitable assumptions, modeled as universal hash function (in the generic case) or a random oracle (in constrained scenarios like sources with weak entropy).

Salt ($r$) acts as a "source-independent extractor", (Note: A random salt enforces independence between the source distribution (of the initial key material) and the extractor itself, and between different uses of the same extractor scheme (for example, a specific instantiation of HMAC) by an application.) strengthening HKDF's security guarantees. Using a fixed public $r$ is safe for multiple invocations of HKDF (on "independent" but secret IKMs which may or may not be derived from the same source), provided $r$ isn't chosen or manipulated by an attacker. Ideally, $r$ is a random string of hash function's output length. Even low quality $r$ (weak entropy or shorter length) is recommended as they contribute "significantly" to the security of the $\mathrm{OKM}$. Without or with a low-entropy, non-secret $r$, if an attacker can influence the $\mathrm{IKM}$s source in a way that specifically exploits HKDF-Extract's underlying hash function (finding a collision or a specific bias), $\mathrm{XTR}$ provides no protection. A random $r$, even if fixed by the application (for example, random number generators using $r$ as seed), would strengthen protections for that specific extractor session. In such a setting, sufficiently long $\mathrm{IKM}$s also provide better entropy extraction. However, allowing the attacker to influence enough of the $\mathrm{IKM}$ after seeing $r$ may result in a completely insecure KDF.

HKDF-Extract is the result of HMAC with $r$ as the key (all zeros up to length of the underlying extractor hash function, if not provided) and the $\mathrm{IKM}$ as the message. The underlying hash function used for HKDF-Extract step may be different to the one used by HKDF-Expand. It is recommended that HKDF-Extract uses strongest hash function available to the application, as it "concentrates" the entropy already present in $\mathrm{IKM}$ but may not necessarily "add" to it. Truncated output from a stronger underlying hash function for $\mathrm{XTR}$ (for example, SHA512/256) offers stronger extraction properties. The attacker is assumed to have partial knowledge about $\mathrm{IKM}$ (publicly known values in the case of Diffie-Hellman) or partial control over it (entropy pools).

HKDF-Extract may be skipped if the $\mathrm{IKM}$ is itself a cryptographically strong key (and hence can assume the role of $\mathrm{PRK}$), though it is recommended that HKDF-Extract be applied for the sake of compatibility with the general case, especially if $r$ is available to the application.

=== HKDF-Expand ===
HKDF-Expand ($\mathrm{PRF*}$) takes the $\mathrm{PRK}$ (or any random key-derivation key if HKDF-Extract step is skipped), optional $info$ ($\mathrm{CTXinfo}$), and a length ($L$), to generate output key material ($\mathrm{OKM}$) of length $L$. Multiple $\mathrm{OKM}$s can be generated from a single $\mathrm{PRK}$ by using different values for $\mathrm{CTXinfo}$, which must be "independent" of the $\mathrm{IKM}$ passed in HKDF-Extract. Even if an attacker, who knows $r$ and some auxiliary information about the secret $\mathrm{IKM}$, can force the use of the same $\mathrm{IKM}$ (and $\mathrm{PRK}$, by extension), in two or more HKDF-Expand contexts (represented by $\mathrm{CTXinfo}$), the $\mathrm{OKM}$s output are computationally independent (leak no useful information on each other).

HKDF-Expand, acting as a variable-output-length pseudorandom function ($\mathrm{PRF*}$) keyed on $\mathrm{PRK}$, calls HMAC on $\mathrm{CTXinfo}$ as the message (empty string, if unspecified) appended to an 8-bit counter $i$ initialized to $1$. Subsequent calls to HMAC are chained in "feedback mode" by prepending the previous HMAC output to $\mathrm{CTXinfo}$ and incrementing $i$. $\mathrm{OKM}$ is a function of the output size ($k$ bits) of HMAC's underlying hash function; i.e., SHA-256 outputs $\mathrm{OKM}$ in segments of $k=256$ bits for up to a maximum length of

$$255 \times k
\text{ bits}
=
255 \times 256
\text{ bits}
=
8160
\text{ bytes},$$

truncated to desired length $L$.

HKDF-Expand may be skipped if $\mathrm{PRK}$ is at least desired length $L$, though it is recommended that HKDF-Expand be applied for additional "smoothing" of the $\mathrm{OKM}$.

== Standardization ==
HKDF was proposed as a building block in various protocols and applications, as well as to discourage the proliferation of multiple KDF mechanisms.

It is formally described in RFC 5869 with detailed analysis in a paper published in 2010. NIST SP800-56Cr2 specifies a parameterizable extract-then-expand scheme, noting that RFC 5869 HKDF is a version of it and citing its paper for the rationale for the recommendations' extract-and-expand mechanisms.

== Applications ==
HKDF is used in the Signal Protocol for end-to-end encrypted messaging where it generates the message keys, in conjunction with the triple Elliptic-curve Diffie-Hellman handshake (X3DH) key agreement protocol. Signal's "Secure Value Recovery" and "Sealed Sender" are based on HKDF. HKDF is a main component in the Noise Protocol Framework, Message Layer Security, and is used in widely deployed protocols like IPsec Internet Key Exchange and TLS 1.3.

The "multi-purpose" nature of HKDF is meant to serve applications that require key extraction, key expansion, and key hierarchies in key wrapping, key exchange, PRNG, and password-based key derivation schemes.

== Implementations ==
There are implementations of HKDF for C#, Go, Java, JavaScript, Perl, PHP, Python, Ruby, Rust, and other programming languages. RFC6234 lays out a reference C implementation of HKDF based on the Secure Hash Standard.

=== Example in Python ===
#!/usr/bin/env python3

import hashlib
import hmac

# nb: unused here; but SHA512/256 in extract phase provides stronger 
# extraction guarantees when expand is SHA256.
# hash_function_extract = hashlib.sha512
# RFC5869 includes SHA-1 test vectors
hash_function = hashlib.sha256

def hmac_digest(key: bytes, data: bytes) -> bytes:
    return hmac.new(key, data, hash_function).digest()


def hkdf_extract(salt: bytes, ikm: bytes) -> bytes:
    if len(salt) == 0:
        salt = bytes([0] * hash_function().digest_size)
    return hmac_digest(salt, ikm)


def hkdf_expand(prk: bytes, info: bytes, length: int) -> bytes:
    t = b""
    okm = b""
    i = 0
    while len(okm) < length:
        i += 1
        t = hmac_digest(prk, t + info + bytes([i]))
        okm += t
    return okm[:length]


def hkdf(salt: bytes, ikm: bytes, info: bytes, length: int) -> bytes:
    prk = hkdf_extract(salt, ikm)
    return hkdf_expand(prk, info, length)


okm = hkdf(
    salt=bytes.fromhex("000102030405060708090a0b0c"),
    ikm=bytes.fromhex("0b0b0b0b0b0b0b0b0b0b0b0b0b0b0b0b0b0b0b0b0b0b"),
    info=bytes.fromhex("f0f1f2f3f4f5f6f7f8f9"),
    length=42,
)
assert okm == bytes.fromhex(
    "3cb25f25faacd57a90434f64d0362f2a"
    "2d2d0a90cf1a5a4c5db02d56ecc4c5bf"
    "34007208d5b887185865"
)

# Zero-length salt
assert hkdf(
    salt=b"",
    ikm=bytes.fromhex("0b0b0b0b0b0b0b0b0b0b0b0b0b0b0b0b0b0b0b0b0b0b"),
    info=b"",
    length=42,
) == bytes.fromhex(
    "8da4e775a563c18f715f802a063c5a31"
    "b8a11f5c5ee1879ec3454e5f3c738d2d"
    "9d201395faa4b61a96c8"
)

== See also ==
- Hash DBRG & HMAC DBRG
- NIST SP 800-90B
- XOF
