= Key signature (cryptography) =

In cryptography, a key signature is the result of a third-party applying a cryptographic signature to a representation of a cryptographic key. This is usually done as a form of assurance or verification: If "Alice" has signed "Bob's" key, it can serve as an assurance to another party, say "Eve", that the key actually belongs to Bob, and that Alice has personally checked and attested to this.

The representation of the key that is signed is usually shorter than the key itself, because most public-key signature schemes can only encrypt or sign short lengths of data. Some derivative of the public key fingerprint may be used, i.e. via hash functions.

== See also ==
- Key (cryptography)
- Public key certificate
