= Cain and Abel (software) =

Password recovery software

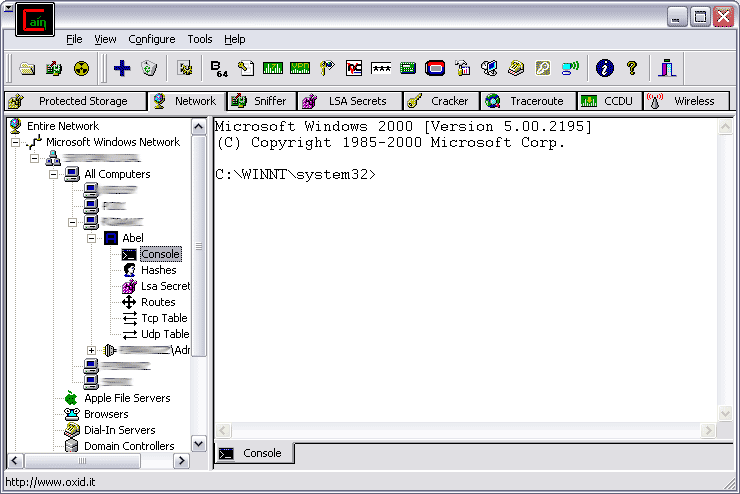
- A screenshot of Cain and Abel interface.
- Developer: Massimiliano Montoro
- Stable release: 4.9.56 / April 7, 2014; 12 years ago
- Operating system: Microsoft Windows
- Type: Password cracking/Packet analysis
- License: Freeware
- Website: web.archive.org/web/20190603235413/http://www.oxid.it/cain.html

Cain and Abel (often abbreviated to Cain) was a password recovery tool for Microsoft Windows. It could recover many kinds of passwords using methods such as network packet sniffing, cracking various password hashes by using methods such as dictionary attacks, brute force and cryptanalysis attacks. Cryptanalysis attacks were done via rainbow tables which could be generated with the winrtgen.exe program provided with Cain and Abel. Cain and Abel was maintained by Massimiliano Montoro and Sean Babcock.

== Features ==
- WEP cracking
- Speeding up packet capture speed by wireless packet injection
- Ability to record VoIP conversations
- Decoding scrambled passwords
- Calculating hashes
- Traceroute
- Revealing password boxes
- Uncovering cached passwords
- Dumping protected storage passwords
- ARP spoofing
- IP to MAC Address resolver
- Network Password Sniffer
- LSA secret dumper
- Ability to crack:
  - LM & NTLM hashes
  - NTLMv2 hashes
  - Microsoft Cache hashes
  - Microsoft Windows PWL files
  - Cisco IOS – MD5 hashes
  - Cisco PIX – MD5 hashes
  - APOP – MD5 hashes
  - CRAM-MD5 MD5 hashes
  - OSPF – MD5 hashes
  - RIPv2 MD5 hashes
  - VRRP – HMAC hashes
  - Virtual Network Computing (VNC) Triple DES
  - MD2 hashes
  - MD4 hashes
  - MD5 hashes
  - SHA-1 hashes
  - SHA-2 hashes
  - RIPEMD-160 hashes
  - Kerberos 5 hashes
  - RADIUS shared key hashes
  - IKE PSK hashes
  - MSSQL hashes
  - MySQL hashes
  - Oracle hashes
  - SIP hashes

== Status with virus scanners ==
Some virus scanners (and browsers, e.g. Google Chrome 20.0.1132.47) detect Cain and Abel as malware.

Avast! detects it as "Win32:Cain-B [Tool]" and classifies it as "Other potentially dangerous program", while Microsoft Security Essentials detects it as "Win32/Cain!4_9_14" and classifies it as "Tool: This program has potentially unwanted behavior." Even if Cain's install directory, as well as the word "Cain", are added to Avast's exclude list, the real-time scanner has been known to stop Cain from functioning. However, the latest version of Avast no longer blocks Cain.

Symantec (the developer of the Norton family of computer security software) identified a buffer overflow vulnerability in version 4.9.24 that allowed for remote code execution in the event the application was used to open a large RDP file, as might occur when using the program to analyze network traffic. The vulnerability had been present in the previous version (4.9.23) as well and was patched in a subsequent release.

== See also ==
- Black-hat hacker
- White-hat hacker
- Hacker (computer security)
- Password cracking
- Aircrack-ng
- Crack
- DaveGrohl
- Hashcat
- John the Ripper
- L0phtCrack
- Ophcrack
- RainbowCrack
