= LAN Manager =

Microsoft network operating system

- Developer: Microsoft, 3Com
- OS family: OS/2
- Working state: Discontinued
- Source model: Closed source
- Initial release: 1987; 39 years ago
- Final release: 2.2a / 1994; 32 years ago
- Marketing target: Local area networking
- Update method: Re-installation
- Package manager: None
- Supported platforms: x86
- License: Proprietary
- Preceded by: MS-Net, Xenix-NET, 3+Share
- Succeeded by: Windows NT 3.1

LAN Manager is a discontinued network operating system (NOS) available from multiple vendors and developed by Microsoft in cooperation with 3Com Corporation. It was designed to succeed 3Com's 3+Share network server software which ran atop a heavily modified version of MS-DOS.

== History ==
The LAN Manager OS/2 operating system was co-developed by IBM and Microsoft, using the Server Message Block (SMB) protocol. It originally used SMB atop either the NetBIOS Frames (NBF) protocol or a specialized version of the Xerox Network Systems (XNS) protocol. These legacy protocols had been inherited from previous products such as MS-Net for MS-DOS, Xenix-NET for MS-Xenix, and the afore-mentioned 3+Share. A version of LAN Manager for Unix-based systems called LAN Manager/X was also available. LAN Manager/X was the basis for Digital Equipment Corporation's Pathworks product for OpenVMS, Ultrix and Tru64.

Despite support from 3Com, IBM, Digital, and Digital Communications Associates, PC wrote in 1989, LAN Manager "has made a very small impression on the market and continues to receive the cold shoulder from buyers" compared to Novell NetWare. The combined companies "pose a strong potential threat", however, the magazine added. In 1990, Microsoft announced LAN Manager 2.0 with a host of improvements, including support for TCP/IP as a transport protocol for SMB, using NetBIOS over TCP/IP (NBT). The last version of LAN Manager, 2.2, which included an MS-OS/2 1.31 base operating system, remained Microsoft's strategic server system until the release of Windows NT Advanced Server in 1993.

=== Versions ===
- 1987 – MS LAN Manager 1.0 (Basic/Enhanced)
- 1989 – MS LAN Manager 1.1
- 1991 – MS LAN Manager 2.0
- 1992 – MS LAN Manager 2.1
- 1992 – MS LAN Manager 2.1a
- 1993 – MS LAN Manager 2.2
- 1994 – MS LAN Manager 2.2a

Many vendors shipped licensed versions, including:

- 3Com Corporation 3+Open
- HP LAN Manager/X
- IBM LAN Server
- Tapestry Torus
- The Santa Cruz Operation

== Password hashing algorithm ==
The LM hash is computed as follows:

1. The user's password is restricted to a maximum of fourteen characters. (Note: If the password is more than fourteen characters long, the LM hash cannot be computed.)
2. The user's password is converted to uppercase.
3. The user's password is encoded in the System OEM code page.
4. This password is NULL-padded to 14 bytes.
5. The “fixed-length” password is split into two 7-byte halves.
6. These values are used to create two DES keys, one from each 7-byte half, by converting the seven bytes into a bit stream with the most significant bit first, and inserting a parity bit after every seven bits (so 1010100 becomes 10101000). This generates the 64 bits needed for a DES key. (A DES key ostensibly consists of 64 bits; however, only 56 of these are actually used by the algorithm. The parity bits added in this step are later discarded.)
7. Each of the two keys is used to DES-encrypt the constant ASCII string “KGS!@#$%”, (Note: The string “KGS!@#$%” could possibly mean Key of Glen and Steve and then the combination of Shift + 12345. Glen Zorn and Steve Cobb are the authors of RFC 2433 (Microsoft PPP CHAP Extensions).) resulting in two 8-byte ciphertext values. The DES CipherMode should be set to ECB, and PaddingMode should be set to NONE.
8. These two ciphertext values are concatenated to form a 16-byte value, which is the LM hash.

== Security weaknesses ==
LAN Manager authentication uses a particularly weak method of hashing a user's password known as the LM hash algorithm, stemming from the mid-1980s when viruses transmitted by floppy disks were the major concern. Although it is based on DES, a well-studied block cipher, the LM hash has several weaknesses in its design. This makes such hashes crackable in a matter of seconds using rainbow tables, or in a few minutes using brute force. Starting with Windows NT, it was replaced by NTLM, which is still vulnerable to rainbow tables, and brute force attacks unless long, unpredictable passwords are used, see password cracking. NTLM is used for logon with local accounts except on domain controllers since Windows Vista and later versions no longer maintain the LM hash by default. Kerberos is used in Active Directory Environments.

The major weaknesses of LAN Manager authentication protocol are:

1. Password length is limited to a maximum of 14 characters chosen from the 95 ASCII printable characters.
2. Passwords are not case sensitive. All passwords are converted into uppercase before generating the hash value. Hence LM hash treats PassWord, password, PaSsWoRd, PASSword and other similar combinations same as PASSWORD. This practice effectively reduces the LM hash key space to 69 characters.
3. A 14-character password is broken into 7+7 characters and the hash is calculated for each half separately. This way of calculating the hash makes it dramatically easier to crack, as the attacker only needs to brute-force 7 characters twice instead of the full 14 characters. This makes the effective strength of a 14-character password equal to only $2\times69^{7} \approx 2^{44}$, or twice that of a 7-character password, which is 3.7 trillion times less complex than the $69^{14} \approx 2^{86}$ theoretical strength of a 14-character single-case password. As of 2020, a computer equipped with a high-end graphics processor (GPUs) can compute 40 billion LM-hashes per second. At that rate, all 7-character passwords from the 95-character set can be tested and broken in half an hour; all 7-character alphanumeric passwords can be tested and broken in 2 seconds.
4. If the password is 7 characters or less, then the second half of hash will always produce same constant value (0xAAD3B435B51404EE). Therefore, a password is less than or equal to 7 characters long can be identified visibly without using tools (though with high speed GPU attacks, this matters less).
5. The hash value is sent to network servers without salting, making it susceptible to man-in-the-middle attacks such as replay the hash. Without salt, time–memory tradeoff pre-computed dictionary attacks, such as a rainbow table, are feasible. In 2003, Ophcrack, an implementation of the rainbow table technique, was published. It specifically targets the weaknesses of LM encryption, and includes pre-computed data sufficient to crack virtually all alphanumeric LM hashes in a few seconds. Many cracking tools, such as RainbowCrack, Hashcat, L0phtCrack and Cain, now incorporate similar attacks and make cracking of LM hashes fast and trivial.

== Workarounds ==
To address the security weaknesses inherent in LM encryption and authentication schemes, Microsoft introduced the NTLMv1 protocol in 1993 with Windows NT 3.1. For hashing, NTLM uses Unicode support, replacing LMhash=DESeach(DOSCHARSET(UPPERCASE(password)), "KGS!@#$%") by NThash=MD4(UTF-16-LE(password)), which does not require any padding or truncating that would simplify the key. On the negative side, the same DES algorithm was used with only 56-bit encryption for the subsequent authentication steps, and there is still no salting. Furthermore, Windows machines were for many years configured by default to send and accept responses derived from both the LM hash and the NTLM hash, so the use of the NTLM hash provided no additional security while the weaker hash was still present. It also took time for artificial restrictions on password length in management tools such as User Manager to be lifted.

While LAN Manager is considered obsolete and current Windows operating systems use the stronger NTLMv2 or Kerberos authentication methods, Windows systems before Windows Vista/Windows Server 2008 enabled the LAN Manager hash by default for backward compatibility with legacy LAN Manager and Windows ME or earlier clients, or legacy NetBIOS-enabled applications. It has for many years been considered good security practice to disable the compromised LM and NTLMv1 authentication protocols where they aren't needed. Starting with Windows Vista and Windows Server 2008, Microsoft disabled the LM hash by default; the feature can be enabled for local accounts via a security policy setting, and for Active Directory accounts by applying the same setting via domain Group Policy. The same method can be used to turn the feature off in Windows 2000, Windows XP and NT. Users can also prevent a LM hash from being generated for their own password by using a password at least fifteen characters in length.—NTLM hashes have in turn become vulnerable in recent years to various attacks that effectively make them as weak today as LanMan hashes were back in 1998.

== Reasons for continued use of LM hash ==
Many legacy third party SMB implementations have taken considerable time to add support for the stronger protocols that Microsoft has created to replace LM hashing because the open source communities supporting these libraries first had to reverse engineer the newer protocols—Samba took 5 years to add NTLMv2 support, while JCIFS took 10 years.

Availability of NTLM protocols to replace LM authentication
Product	NTLMv1 support	NTLMv2 support
Windows NT 3.1	RTM (1993)	Not supported
Windows NT 3.5	RTM (1994)	Not supported
Windows NT 3.51	RTM (1995)	Not supported
Windows NT 4	RTM (1996)	Service Pack 4 (October 25, 1998)
Windows 95	Not supported	Directory services client (released with Windows 2000 Server, February 17, 2000)
Windows 98	RTM	Directory services client (released with Windows 2000 Server, February 17, 2000)
Windows 2000	RTM (February 17, 2000)	RTM (February 17, 2000)
Windows Me	RTM (September 14, 2000)	Directory services client (released with Windows 2000 Server, February 17, 2000)
Samba	?	Version 3.0 (September 24, 2003)
JCIFS	Not supported	Version 1.3.0 (October 25, 2008)
IBM AIX (SMBFS)	5.3 (2004)	Not supported as of v7.1

Poor patching regimes subsequent to software releases supporting the feature becoming available have contributed to some organisations continuing to use LM Hashing in their environments, even though the protocol is easily disabled in Active Directory itself.

Lastly, prior to the release of Windows Vista, many unattended build processes still used a DOS boot disk (instead of Windows PE) to start the installation of Windows using WINNT.EXE, something that requires LM hashing to be enabled for the legacy LAN Manager networking stack to work.

== See also ==
- NT LAN Manager
- Active Directory
- Password cracking
- Dictionary attack
- Remote Program Load (RPL)
- Security Account Manager
