= DaveGrohl =

MacOS password cracker

- Developer(s): Octomagon
- Stable release: 2.1 / November 30, 2012
- Repository: github.com/octomagon/davegrohl
- Operating system: Mac OS X
- Type: password cracking
- License: GNU GPL 2.0

DaveGrohl is a brute-force password cracker for macOS. It was originally created in 2010 as a password hash extractor but has since evolved into a standalone or distributed password cracker. DaveGrohl supports all of the standard Mac OS X user password hashes (MD4, SHA-512 and PBKDF2) used since OS X Lion and also can extract them formatted for other popular password crackers like John the Ripper. The latest stable release is designed specifically for Mac OS X Lion and Mountain Lion.

== Attack methods ==
DaveGrohl supports both dictionary and incremental attacks. A dictionary attack will scan through a number of pre-defined wordlists while an incremental attack will count through a character set until it finds the password. While in distributed mode, it uses Bonjour to find all the server nodes on the local network and therefore requires no configuration.

== See also ==
- Password cracking
- Key stretching
- Aircrack-ng
- Cain and Abel
- Crack
- Hashcat
- John the Ripper
