= Hydra (software) =

Password cracking software

THC Hydra
- Developer: THC
- Stable release: 9.7 / 3 May 2026; 4 months ago
- Written in: C
- Operating system: Cross-platform
- Platform: Unix
- Type: Password cracking
- License: GNU General Public License (version 3 or later)
- Website: www.thc.org
- Repository: github.com/vanhauser-thc/thc-hydra

Hydra (or THC Hydra) is a parallelized network login cracker built into various operating systems like Kali Linux, Parrot and other major penetration testing environments. It was created as a proof of concept tool, for security researchers to demonstrate how easy it can be to crack logins. Hydra works by using different approaches, such as brute-force attacks and dictionary attacks, in order to guess the right username and password combination. Hydra is commonly used by penetration testers together with a set of programmes like crunch, cupp etc, which are used to generate wordlists based on user-defined patterns.

== Functionality ==
Hydra can launch attacks on multiple targets at once using threads, called hydra heads. The tool keeps track of the threads using another structure, the hydra brain. Each target is attacked using a module that corresponds to a protocol (eg. if the target is an SSH server, the SSH module is used).

== Supported protocols ==
Hydra supports many common login protocols like forms on websites, FTP, SMB, POP3, IMAP, MySQL, VNC, SSH, HTTP(S) and others. (Cisco AAA, Cisco auth, Cisco enable, CVS, HTTP-Proxy, ICQ, IRC, LDAP, MS-SQL, NNTP, Oracle Listener, Oracle SID, PC-Anywhere, PC-NFS, PostgreSQL, RDP, Rexec, Rlogin, Rsh, SIP, SMTP, SMTP Enum, SNMP v1+v2+v3, SOCKS5, Subversion, Telnet, VMware-Auth and XMPP)
