= DST (disambiguation) =

DST is daylight saving time, a seasonal adjustment to civil time.

DST may also refer to:

== Academia ==
- Delta Sigma Theta, an American organization of college-educated women
- Doctor of Sacred Theology, highest qualification in Roman Catholic theology

== Businesses ==
- DST Systems, an American technology company
- Digital Signature Trust Company, a cryptographic root certificate authority (now owned by IdenTrust)
- Digital Sky Technologies, a Russian investment firm

== Government, law and military ==
- Defence School of Transport, Leconfield, Yorkshire, England
- Defence Science and Technology Group, ancillary Australian national security agency
- Delaware statutory trust
- Department of Science and Technology (South Africa)
- Department of Science and Technology (Philippines)
- Department of Science and Technology (India)
- Digital Service Tax
- Direction de la surveillance du territoire, defunct French intelligence agency
- Direction générale de la surveillance du territoire, Moroccan intelligence agency

== Mathematics ==
- Dempster–Shafer theory, in probabilistic logic, a model of uncertainty
- Descriptive set theory, in logic
- Discrete sine transform, a Fourier transform variant
- Dynamical systems theory, related to chaos theory

== Science ==
- Descending subtraction task, a clinical cognitive test
- Developmental systems theory, an evolutionary biology framework
- Dexamethasone suppression test, in endocrine medicine, a measure of adrenal gland function
- Dialogical self theory, in psychology
- Disturbance storm time index, in aeronomy, a measure of space weather near Earth
- Dystonin, a protein relevant to neurology and its related human gene

== Technology ==
- Data Storage Technology, a 1992 magnetic-tape data-storage format
- Decision support tool, see Decision support system
- Deep Space Transport, a crewed interplanetary spacecraft concept
- Digital signature transponder, Texas Instruments' RFID device
- Direct Stream Transfer, a lossless audio compression format used by SACD
- Douglas Sleeper Transport, a 1940s aircraft model (precursor to the Douglas DC-3)
- Drill stem test, in oil exploration

== See also ==
- DS&T
