= SciEngines GmbH =

German supercomputer company

SciEngines GmbH is a privately owned company founded 2007 as a spin-off of the COPACOBANA project by the Universities of Bochum and Kiel, both in Germany. The project intended to create a platform for an affordable Custom hardware attack. COPACOBANA is a massively-parallel reconfigurable computer. It can be utilized to perform a so-called Brute force attack to recover DES encrypted data. It consists of 120 commercially available, reconfigurable integrated circuits (FPGAs). These Xilinx Spartan3-1000 run in parallel, and create a massively parallel system. Since 2007, SciEngines GmbH has enhanced and developed successors of COPACOBANA. Furthermore, the COPACOBANA has become a well known reference platform for cryptanalysis and custom hardware based attacks to symmetric, asymmetric cyphers and stream ciphers. 2008 attacks against A5/1 stream cipher an encryption system been used to encrypt voice streams in GSM have been published as the first known real world attack utilizing off-the-shelf custom hardware.

They introduced in 2008 their RIVYERA S3-5000 enhancing the performance of the computer dramatically via using 128 Spartan-3 5000's. Currently SciEngines RIVYERA holds the record in brute-force breaking DES utilizing 128 Spartan-3 5000 FPGAs. Current systems provide a unique density of up to 256 Spartan-6 FPGAs per single system enabling scientific utilization beyond the field of cryptanalysis, like bioinformatics.

2006 original developers of the COPACOBANA form the company
2007 introduction of the COPACOBANA (Copacobana S3-1000) as a [COTS]
2007 first demonstration of COPACOBANA 5000
2008 they introduced RIVYERA S3-5000, the direct successor of COPACOBANA 5000 and COPACOBANA. The RIVYERA architecture introduced a new high performance optimized bus system and a fully API encapsulated communication framework.
2008 demonstration of the COPACOBANA V4-SX35, a 128 Virtex-4 SX35 FPGA cluster (COPACOBANA shared bus architecture)
2008 introduction of the RIVYERA V4-SX35, a 128 Virtex-4 SX35 FPGA cluster (RIVYERA HPC architecture)
2009 they introduced RIVYERA S6-LX150.
2011 they introduced 256 User usable FPGAs per RIVYERA S6-LX150 computer.

Providing a standard off-the-shelf Intel CPU and mainboard integrated into the FPGA computer RIVYERA systems allow to execute most standard code without modifications. SciEngines aims that programmers only have to focus on porting the most time-consuming 5% of their code to the FPGA. Therefore, they bundle an Eclipse like development environment which allows code implementation in hardware based implementation languages e.g. VHDL, Verilog as well as in C based languages. An Application Programming Interface in C, C++, Java and Fortran allow scientists and programmers to adopt their code to benefit from an application-specific hardware architecture.
