= Muffett =

Muffett is a surname. Notable people with the surname include:

- Alec Muffett (born 1968), Anglo-American software engineer
- Billy Muffett (1930-2008), American baseball player

== See also ==
- Little Miss Muffet, a nursery rhyme
- Thomas Muffet (1553-1604), English naturalist and physician
- Muffet, a spider-like character from the 2015 video game Undertale
