= Dictionary attack =

Technique for defeating password protection using lists of likely possibilities

In cryptanalysis and computer security, a dictionary attack is an attack using a restricted subset of a keyspace to defeat a cipher or authentication mechanism by trying to determine its decryption key or passphrase, sometimes trying thousands or millions of likely possibilities often obtained from lists of past security breaches.

== Technique ==
A dictionary attack is based on trying all the strings in a pre-arranged listing. Such attacks originally used words found in a dictionary (hence the phrase dictionary attack); however, now there are much larger lists available on the open Internet containing hundreds of millions of passwords recovered from past data breaches. There is also cracking software that can use such lists and produce common variations, such as substituting numbers for similar-looking letters. A dictionary attack tries only those possibilities which are deemed most likely to succeed. Dictionary attacks often succeed because many people have a tendency to choose short passwords that are ordinary words or common passwords; or variants obtained, for example, by appending a digit or punctuation character, which are easily covered by modern cracking software pattern generation. A safer approach is to randomly generate a long password (15 letters or more) or a multiword passphrase, using a password manager program or manually typing a password.

Dictionary attacks can be deterred by the server administrator by using a more computationally expensive hashing algorithm. Bcrypt, scrypt, and Argon2 are examples of such resource intensive functions that require significant computational power to process, allowing for large improvements in security against dictionary attacks. While other hashing functions, such as SHA and MD5, are much faster and less expensive to compute, they can still be strengthened by being applied multiple times to an input string through a process called key stretching. An attacker would have to know approximately how many times the function was applied for a dictionary attack to be feasible.

== Pre-computed dictionary attack/Rainbow table attack ==
It is possible to achieve a time–space tradeoff by pre-computing a list of hashes of dictionary words and storing these in a database using the hash as the key. This requires a considerable amount of preparation time, but this allows the actual attack to be executed faster. The storage requirements for the pre-computed tables were once a major cost, but now they are less of an issue because of the low cost of disk storage. Pre-computed dictionary attacks are particularly effective when a large number of passwords are to be cracked. The pre-computed dictionary needs be generated only once, and when it is completed, password hashes can be looked up almost instantly at any time to find the corresponding password. A more refined approach involves the use of rainbow tables, which reduce storage requirements at the cost of slightly longer lookup-times. See LM hash for an example of an authentication system compromised by such an attack.

Pre-computed dictionary attacks, or "rainbow table attacks", can be thwarted by the use of salt, a technique that forces the hash dictionary to be recomputed for each password sought, making precomputation infeasible, provided that the number of possible salt values is large enough.

== Dictionary attack software ==
- Cain and Abel
- Crack
- Aircrack-ng
- John the Ripper
- Hashcat
- L0phtCrack
- Metasploit Project
- Ophcrack
- Cryptool

== See also ==
- Brute-force attack
- E-mail address harvesting
- Intercontinental Dictionary Series, an online linguistic database
- Key derivation function
- Key stretching
- Password cracking
- Password strength
