= RainbowCrack =

- Developer(s): Zhu Shuanglei
- Stable release: 1.8 / August 25, 2020
- Operating system: Windows and Linux
- Type: password cracking
- Website: project-rainbowcrack.com

RainbowCrack is a computer program which generates rainbow tables to be used in password cracking. RainbowCrack differs from "conventional" brute force crackers in that it uses large pre-computed tables called rainbow tables to reduce the length of time needed to crack a password drastically. RainbowCrack was developed by Zhu Shuanglei, and implements an improved time–memory tradeoff cryptanalysis attack which originated in Philippe Oechslin's Ophcrack.

Some organizations have made RainbowCrack's rainbow tables available free over the internet.
