= Speedpass =

Keychain radio-frequency identification

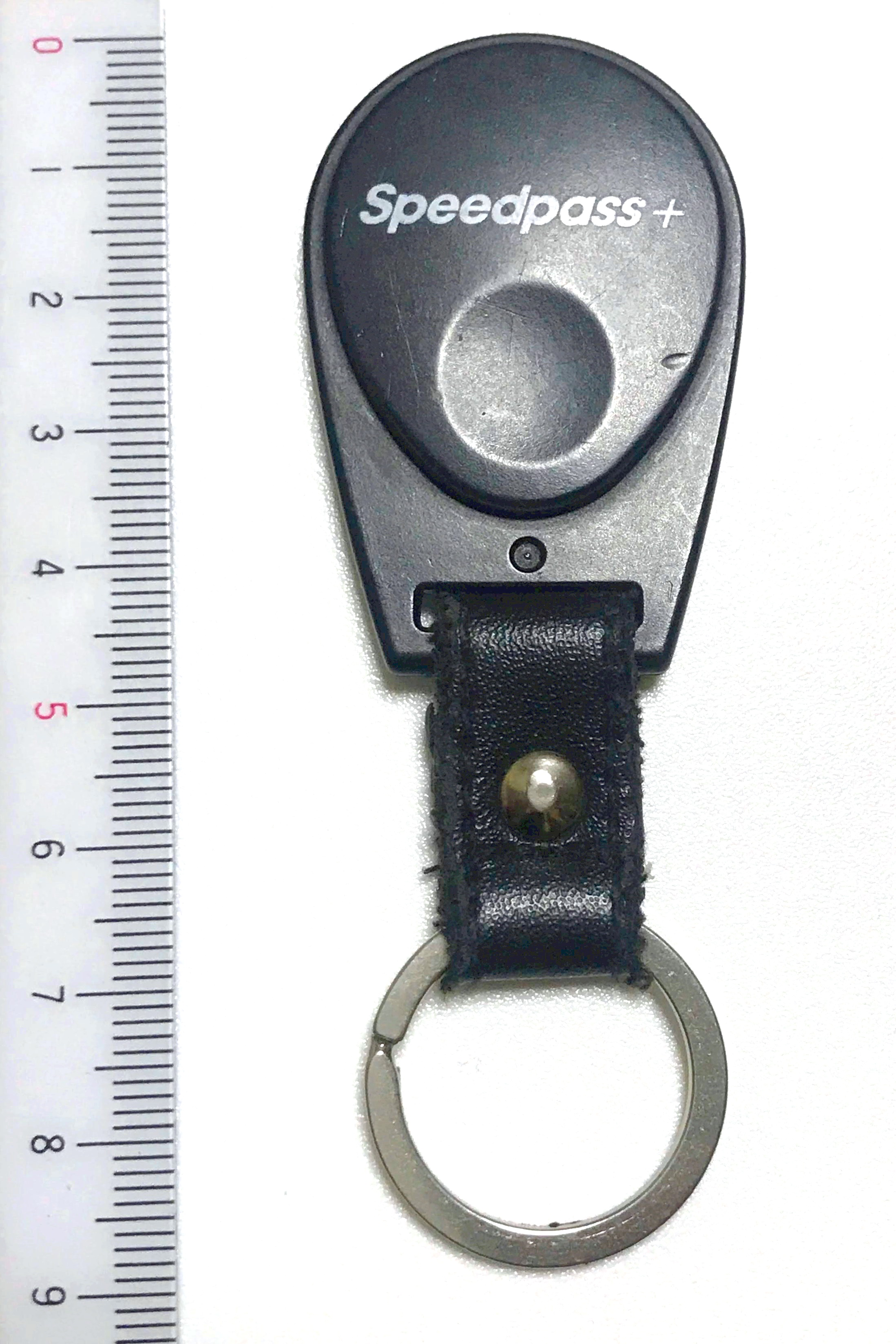
- Product type: Radio-frequency identification
- Current owner: ExxonMobil
- Country: United States
- Introduced: 1997; 29 years ago
- Discontinued: 2019; 7 years ago; name still continues as an application as Speedpass+ in Canada and as a functionality on the Exxon Mobil Rewards+ application in the United States
- Previous owners: Mobil (1997–99)

Speedpass was a keychain radio-frequency identification (RFID) device introduced in 1997 by Mobil (which merged with Exxon to become ExxonMobil in 1999) for electronic payment. It was originally developed by Verifone. By 2004, more than seven million people possessed Speedpass tags, which could be used at approximately 10,000 Exxon, Mobil and Esso gas stations worldwide.

Speedpass was one of the first widely deployed consumer RFID payment systems of its kind, debuting nationwide in 1997 far ahead of Visa and MasterCard RFID trials.

== History ==
The ExxonMobil Speedpass was based on the Texas Instruments TIRIS RFID platform. It was originally designed by Verifone in two configurations; one intended for installation inside the fuel dispensing "pump", and a convenience store model known as the Verifone RF250 (which was a redesign of the Ingenico iSC250 reader for smart cards).

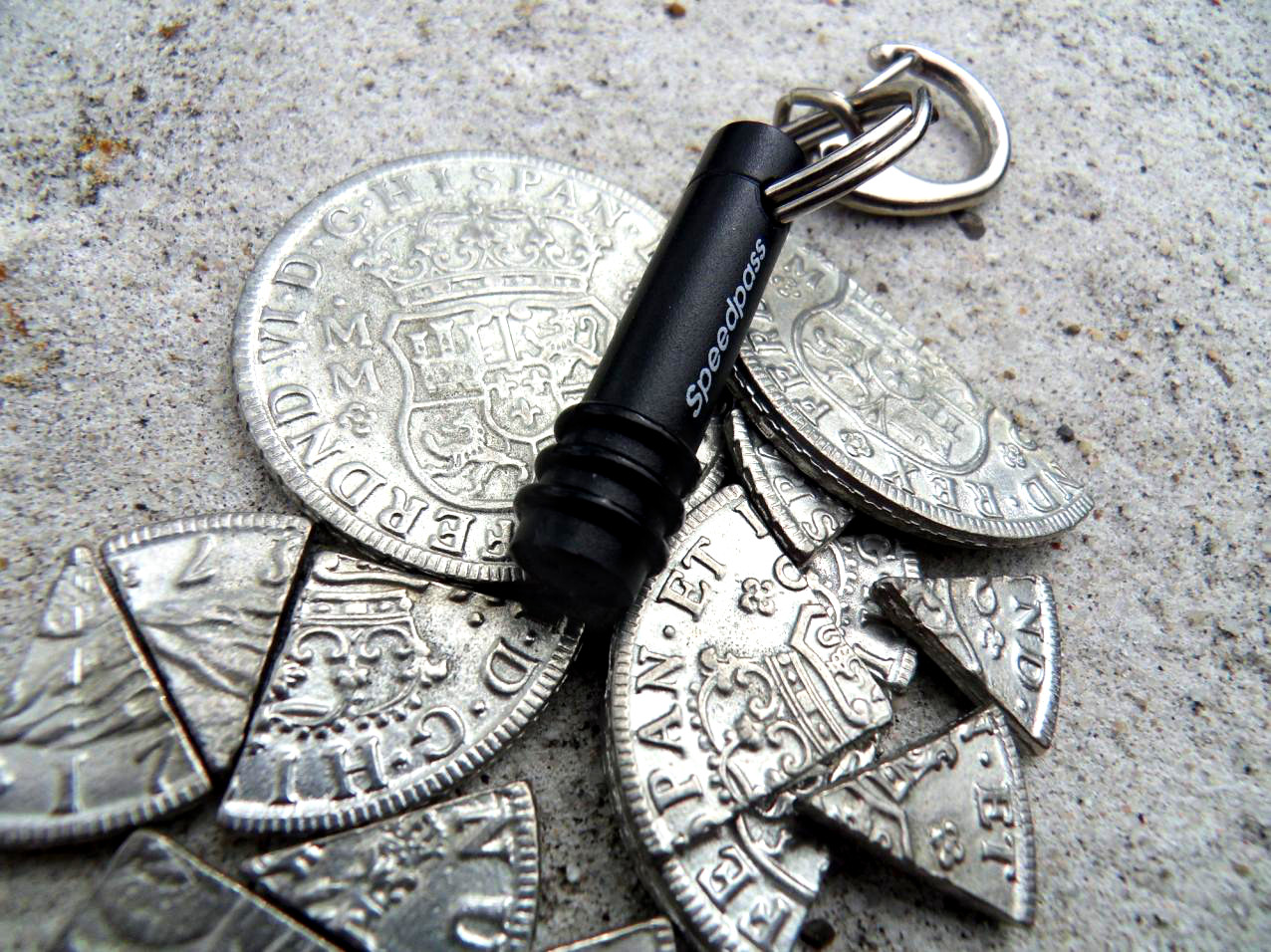
Speedpass with Spanish pieces of eight

The ExxonMobil Speedpass used a cryptographically-enabled tag with a Digital Signature Transponder (DST) which incorporated a weak, proprietary encryption scheme to perform a challenge–response protocol. On January 29, 2005, RSA Security and a group of students from Johns Hopkins University broke the proprietary encryption algorithm used by the Exxon-Mobil Speedpass. They were able to successfully copy a Speedpass and use the copied RFID tag to purchase gas.

In an attempt to prevent fraud, Speedpass users ultimately were required to enter their zip code into scanners at some gas stations.

== Convenience stores and the "Flying Red Horse" ==
At one point, Speedpass was deployed experimentally in fast-food restaurants and supermarkets in select markets. McDonald's alone deployed Speedpass in over 400 restaurants in the Greater Chicago area.

During the 1998 development of the RF250 convenience store reader, some prototype units were shipped from Verifone in Rocklin, California, to a Verifone office in Florida. The units did not arrive on time and were thought to have been lost in transit. They were later found, and despite each unit having a Verifone logo and being encased in boxes showing the Verifone logo; the shipping company had nothing in their lost goods database showing that name. Rather, the units turned up via a query for "flying red horse", apparently since the units displayed a small Mobil logo - and the Mobil logo was and is a red Pegasus. The internal codename for the project was thus changed to "Flying Red Horse".

The test was deemed a failure and McDonald's removed the scanners from all their restaurants in mid-2004. Additionally, the New England grocery chain Stop & Shop tested Speedpass at their Boston area stores; the units were removed in early 2005. Speedpass has also been previously available through a Speedpass Car Tag and a Speedpass-enabled Timex watch.

== Discontinuance and the switch to Speedpass+ ==
ExxonMobil announced that the RFID based key tag would be fully retired by June 30, 2019. ExxonMobil directed users to use the Speedpass+ app on their smartphone. The smartphone app uses the phone's location data to pay at the pump using the app. The app detects the users location which then prompts the user to input the pump number they are using. Conversely if location services are not activated for the app, the user can scan a QR code on the pump to activate pay at the pump functionality. In the United States, the app has since been renamed the Exxon Mobil Rewards+ app, although it still utilizes the Speedpass+ functionality. In Canada, it continued to use the Speedpass+ name for its app until 2023, when the app was renamed Esso and Mobil App.

== See also ==
- Pay at the pump
- Loyalty program
