= Alec Muffett =

Software engineer, security expert (born 1968)

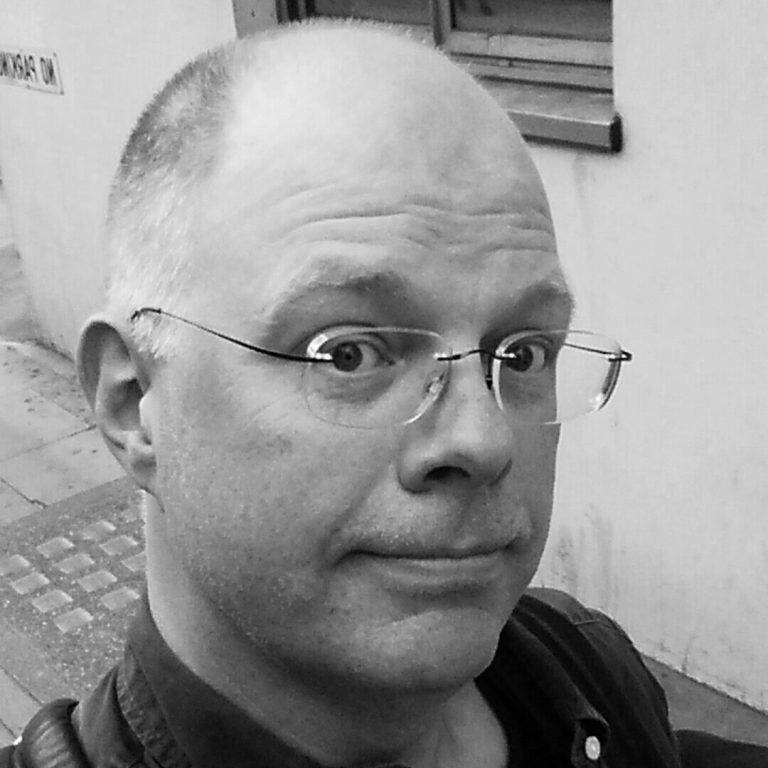
- Born: Alec David Edward Muffett; 22 April 1968 (age 58)
- Occupations: Internet-security evangelist, architect, and software engineer

Alec David Edward Muffett (born 22 April 1968) is an Anglo-American internet security expert and software engineer.

== Career ==
Muffett joined Sun Microsystems in 1992, working initially as a systems administrator. He rose through the ranks to become the principal engineer for security, a position which he held until he was retrenched, with many others, in 2009 (shortly before Oracle acquired Sun). While at Sun he was one of the researchers who worked on the factorization of the 512 bit RSA Challenge Number; RSA-155 was successfully factorized in August 1999. He created Crack, the original password cracker for Unix, and for the CrackLib password-integrity testing library.

In 2015, Muffett was named as one of the top six influential security thinkers by SC Magazine.

Muffett assisted in creating .onion websites for The New York Times, Wikipedia, BBC News, Brave, Twitter, The Guardian, and Reddit.
