= Openwall Project =

Software distributor

- Developer(s): Solar Designer
- Operating system: Unix-like
- Type: Security
- Website: openwall.com

The Openwall Project is a source for various software, including Openwall GNU/*/Linux (Owl), a security-enhanced Linux distribution designed for servers. Openwall patches and security extensions have been included into many major Linux distributions.

As the name implies, Openwall GNU/*/Linux draws source code and design concepts from numerous sources; most importantly to the project is its usage of the Linux kernel and parts of the GNU userland, and others include the BSDs, such as OpenBSD for its OpenSSH suite and the inspiration behind its own Blowfish-based crypt for password hashing, compatible with the OpenBSD implementation.

== Public domain software ==
The Openwall project maintains also a list of algorithms and source code which is public domain software.

== Openwall GNU/*/Linux releases ==
| Openwall Version | Release date | End-of-life date | Kernel version |
|---|---|---|---|
| 0.1 | 13 March 2002 | ? | 2.2.20 |
| 1.0 | 2002-≈≤≥10-15 | ? | 2.2.22 |
| 1.1 | 23 December 2003 | ? | 2.4.23 |
| 2.0 | 14 February 2006 | ? | 2.4.32 |
| 3.0 | 16 December 2010 | ? | 2.6.18 |
| 3.1 | 5 January 2015 | ? | 2.6.18 |
Unsupported Supported Latest version

LWN.net reviewed Openwall Linux 3.0. They wrote:

The first question most people will have is: what is so "security-enhanced" about Owl? Aren't major Linux distributions such as Red Hat Enterprise Linux, Ubuntu, openSUSE, and so on secure? Of course, they continuously patch known security vulnerabilities and some of them (Red Hat in particular) implement security features to decrease the impact of vulnerabilities, but none of them really are focused on preventing vulnerable software from getting into the distribution in the first place.

== PoC||GTFO ==
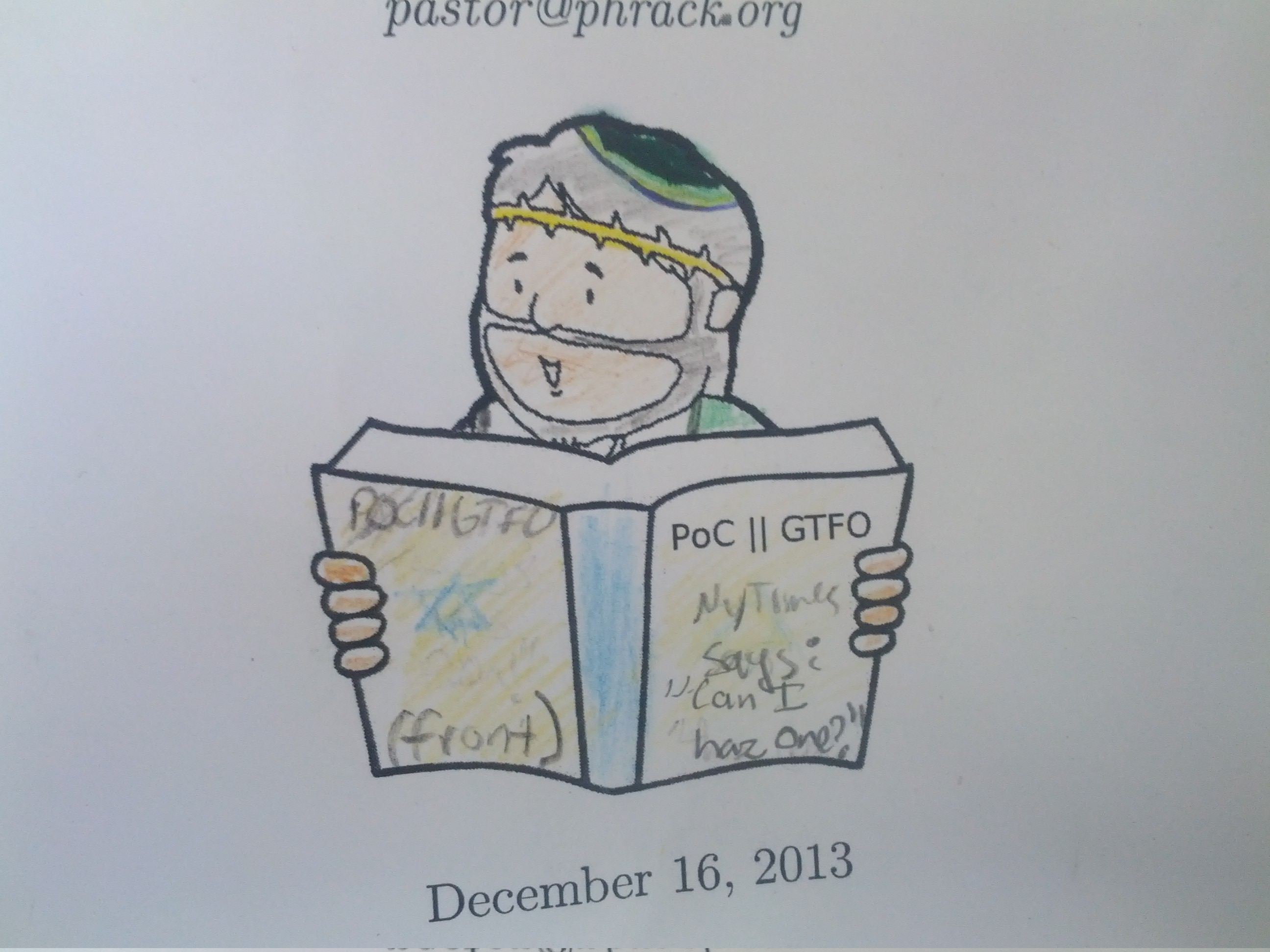
Rt. Revd. Pastor Manul Laphroaig

Issues of the International Journal of Proof-of-Concept or Get The Fuck Out (PoC||GTFO) are mirrored by the Openwall Project under a samizdat licence. The first issue #00 was published in 2013, issue #02 featured the Chaos Computer Club. Issue #07 in 2015 was a homage for Dr. Dobb's Journal, which could be rendered as .pdf, .zip, .bpg, or .html.

== See also ==
- Executable space protection
- Comparison of Linux distributions
- Security-focused operating system
- John the Ripper
