= TWIRL =

Hypothetical hardware device

In cryptography and number theory, TWIRL (The Weizmann Institute Relation Locator) is a hypothetical hardware device designed to speed up the sieving step of the general number field sieve integer factorization algorithm. During the sieving step, the algorithm searches for numbers with a certain mathematical relationship. In distributed factoring projects, this is the step that is parallelized to a large number of processors.

TWIRL is still a hypothetical device, and no implementation has been publicly reported. However, its designers, Adi Shamir and Eran Tromer, estimate that if TWIRL were built, it would be able to factor 1024-bit numbers in one year at the cost of "a few dozen million US dollars". TWIRL could therefore have enormous repercussions in cryptography and computer security, as many high-security systems still use 1024-bit RSA keys, which TWIRL would be "able to break in one year at a cost of $10M".

Some important cryptographic algorithms, notably RSA and the Blum Blum Shub pseudorandom number generator, rely on the difficulty of factorizing large integers. If factorizing large integers becomes easier, users of these algorithms will have to resort to using larger keys (computationally more expensive) or to using different algorithms, whose security rests on some other computationally hard problem (like the discrete logarithm problem).

== See also ==
- Custom hardware attack
- TWINKLE
- Logjam (computer security)
