= TWINKLE =

Hypothetical device

TWINKLE (The Weizmann Institute Key Locating Engine) is a hypothetical integer factorization device described in 1999 by Adi Shamir and purported to be capable of factoring 512-bit integers. It is also a pun on the twinkling LEDs used in the device. Shamir estimated that the cost of TWINKLE could be as low as $5000 per unit with bulk production. TWINKLE has a successor named TWIRL which is more efficient.

== Method ==
TWINKLE is designed to implement the sieving step of the Number Field Sieve algorithm, which is the fastest known algorithm for factoring large integers. The sieving step involves testing a large set of numbers for B-'smoothness', i.e., absence of a prime factor greater than a specified bound B.

TWINKLE is not a purely digital device. It gets its efficiency by eschewing binary arithmetic for an "optical" adder which can add hundreds of thousands of quantities in a single clock cycle.

Conventional NFS sieving is carried out one prime at a time. For each prime, all the numbers to be tested for smoothness in the range under consideration which are divisible by that prime have their counter incremented by the logarithm of the prime (similar to the sieve of Eratosthenes). TWINKLE, on the other hand, works one candidate smooth number (call it X) at a time. There is one LED corresponding to each prime smaller than B. At the time instant corresponding to X, the set of LEDs glowing corresponds to the set of primes that divide X. This can be accomplished by having the LED associated with the prime p glow once every p time instants. Further, the intensity of each LED is proportional to the logarithm of the corresponding prime. Thus, the total intensity equals the sum of the logarithms of all the prime factors of X smaller than B. This intensity is equal to the logarithm of X if and only if X is B-smooth.

Even in PC-based implementations, it is a common optimization to speed up sieving by adding approximate logarithms of small primes together. Similarly, TWINKLE has much room for error in its light measurements; as long as the intensity is at about the right level, the number is very likely to be smooth enough for the purposes of known factoring algorithms. The existence of even one large factor would imply that the logarithm of a large number is missing, resulting in a very low intensity; because most numbers have this property, the device's output would tend to consist of stretches of low intensity output with brief bursts of high intensity output.

In the above it is assumed that X is square-free, i.e. it is not divisible by the square of any prime. This is acceptable since the factoring algorithms only require "sufficiently many" smooth numbers, and the "yield" decreases only by a small constant factor due to the square-freeness assumption. There is also the problem of false positives due to the inaccuracy of the optoelectronic hardware, but this is easily solved by adding a PC-based post-processing step for verifying the smoothness of the numbers identified by TWINKLE.

== See also ==
- TWIRL, the successor to TWINKLE
