= Hashcat =

Open-source password recovery tool

- Developers: Jens 'atom' Steube, Gabriele 'matrix' Gristina
- Stable release: 7.1.2 / 23 August 2025; 7 months ago
- Operating system: Cross-platform
- Type: Password cracking
- License: MIT License
- Website: www.hashcat.net
- Repository: github.com/hashcat/hashcat

Hashcat is a password recovery tool. It had a proprietary code base until 2015, but was then released as open source software. Versions are available for Linux, macOS, and Windows. Examples of hashcat-supported hashing algorithms are LM hashes, MD4, MD5, SHA-family and Unix Crypt formats as well as algorithms used in MySQL and Cisco PIX.

Hashcat has received publicity because it is partly based on flaws in other software discovered by its creator. An example was a flaw in 1Password's password manager hashing scheme. It has also been compared to similar software in a Usenix publication and been described on Ars Technica.

== Variants ==
Previously, two variants of hashcat existed:

- hashcat - CPU-based password recovery tool
- oclHashcat/cudaHashcat - GPU-accelerated tool (OpenCL or CUDA)

With the release of hashcat v3.00, the GPU and CPU tools were merged into a single tool called hashcat. The CPU-only version became hashcat-legacy. Both CPU and GPU now require OpenCL.

Many of the algorithms supported by hashcat-legacy (such as MD5, SHA1, and others) can be cracked in a shorter time with the GPU-based hashcat. However, not all algorithms can be accelerated by GPUs. Bcrypt is an example of this. Due to factors such as data-dependent branching, serialization, and memory (and more), oclHashcat/cudaHashcat weren't catchall replacements for hashcat-legacy.

hashcat-legacy is available for Linux, OSX and Windows. hashcat is available for macOS, Windows, and Linux with GPU, CPU and generic OpenCL support which allows for FPGAs and other accelerator cards.

== Sample output ==
hashcat (v7.0.0) starting

CUDA API (CUDA 12.9)
====================
* Device #01: NVIDIA GeForce RTX 4090, 23687/24080 MB, 128MCU
* Device #02: NVIDIA GeForce RTX 4090, 23687/24080 MB, 128MCU

OpenCL API (OpenCL 3.0 CUDA 12.9.76) - Platform #2 [NVIDIA Corporation]
=======================================================================
* Device #04: NVIDIA GeForce RTX 4090, skipped
* Device #05: NVIDIA GeForce RTX 4090, skipped

Minimum password length supported by kernel: 0
Maximum password length supported by kernel: 256
Minimum salt length supported by kernel: 0
Maximum salt length supported by kernel: 256

Hashes: 1 digests; 1 unique digests, 1 unique salts
Bitmaps: 16 bits, 65536 entries, 0x0000ffff mask, 262144 bytes, 5/13 rotates

Optimizers applied:
* Zero-Byte
* Single-Hash
* Single-Salt
* Brute-Force
* Slow-Hash-DimensionY-LOOP

Watchdog: Temperature abort trigger set to 90c

Host memory allocated for this attack: 512 MB (164979 MB free)

$argon2id$v=19$m=65536,t=3,p=1$FBMjI4RJBhIykCgol1KEJA$2ky5GAdhT1kH4kIgPN/oERE3Taiy43vNN70a3HpiKQU:hashcat

Session..........: hashcat
Status...........: Cracked
Hash.Mode........: 34000 (Argon2)
Hash.Target......: $argon2id$v=19$m=65536,t=3,p=1$FBMjI4RJBhIykCgol1KE...HpiKQU
Time.Started.....: Fri Aug  1 14:07:43 2025 (14 secs)
Time.Estimated...: Fri Aug  1 14:07:57 2025 (0 secs)
Kernel.Feature...: Pure Kernel (password length 0-256 bytes)
Guess.Mask.......: ?l?l?l?lcat [7]
Guess.Queue......: 1/1 (100.00%)
Speed.#01........:     1699 H/s (17.23ms) @ Accel:354 Loops:1 Thr:32 Vec:1
Speed.#02........:     1696 H/s (17.21ms) @ Accel:354 Loops:1 Thr:32 Vec:1
Speed.#*.........:     3395 H/s
Recovered........: 1/1 (100.00%) Digests (total), 1/1 (100.00%) Digests (new)
Progress.........: 45666/456976 (9.99%)
Rejected.........: 0/45666 (0.00%)
Restore.Point....: 1062/17576 (6.04%)
Restore.Sub.#01..: Salt:0 Amplifier:12-13 Iteration:11-12
Restore.Sub.#02..: Salt:0 Amplifier:12-13 Iteration:10-11
Candidate.Engine.: Device Generator
Candidates.#01...: htrecat -> hoelcat
Candidates.#02...: hepacat -> hbencat
Hardware.Mon.#01.: Temp: 53c Fan: 30% Util: 99% Core:2790MHz Mem:10251MHz Bus:16
Hardware.Mon.#02.: Temp: 51c Fan: 30% Util: 99% Core:2715MHz Mem:10251MHz Bus:8

Started: Fri Aug  1 14:07:35 2025
Stopped: Fri Aug  1 14:07:58 2025

== Attack types ==
Hashcat offers multiple attack modes for obtaining effective and complex coverage over a hash's keyspace. These modes are:

- Brute-force attack
- Combinator attack
- Dictionary attack
- Fingerprint attack
- Hybrid attack
- Mask attack
- Permutation attack
- Rule-based attack
- Table-Lookup attack (CPU only)
- Toggle-Case attack
- PRINCE attack (in CPU version 0.48 and higher only)

The traditional bruteforce attack is considered outdated, and the Hashcat core team recommends the Mask-Attack as a full replacement.

== Competitions ==
Team Hashcat (the official team of the Hashcat software composed of core Hashcat members) won first place in the KoreLogic "Crack Me If you Can" Competitions at DefCon in 2010, 2012, 2014, 2015, and 2018, and at DerbyCon in 2017.

== See also ==
- Brute-force attack
- Brute-force search
- Hacker (computer security)
- Hacking tool
- Openwall Project
- Password cracking
