= Microsoft Office password protection =

Security feature in Microsoft Office

Microsoft Office password protection is a security feature that allows Microsoft Office documents (e.g. Word, Excel, PowerPoint) to be protected with a user-provided password.

== Types ==
There are two types of passwords that can be set to a document:

- A password to encrypt a document restricts opening and viewing it. This is possible in all Microsoft Office applications. Since Office 2007, they are hard to break if a sufficiently complex password was chosen. If the password can be determined through social engineering, the underlying cipher is not important.
- Passwords that do not encrypt but restrict modification and can be circumvented.
  - In Word and PowerPoint the password restricts modification of the entire document.
  - In Excel passwords restrict modification of the workbook, a worksheet within it, or individual elements in the worksheet.

== History of Office encryption ==
=== Weak encryptions ===
In Excel and Word 95 and prior editions a weak protection algorithm is used that converts a password to a 16-bit verifier and a 16-byte XOR obfuscation array key. Hacking software is now readily available to find a 16-byte key and decrypt the password-protected document.

Office 97, 2000, XP and 2003 use RC4 with 40 bits. The implementation contains multiple vulnerabilities rendering it insecure.

In Office XP and 2003 an opportunity to use a custom protection algorithm was added. Choosing a non-standard Cryptographic Service Provider allows increasing the key length. Weak passwords can still be recovered quickly even if a custom CSP is on.

=== AES since Office 2007 ===
In Office 2007, protection was significantly enhanced by using AES as a cipher. Using SHA-1 as a hash function, the password is stretched into a 128-bit key 50,000 times before opening the document; as a result, the time required to crack it is vastly increased, similar to PBKDF2, scrypt or other KDFs.

Office 2010 employed AES and a 128-bit key, but the number of SHA-1 conversions doubled to 100,000.

Office 2013 uses 128-bit AES, again with hash algorithm SHA-1 by default. It introduces SHA-512 hashes in the encryption algorithm, making brute-force and rainbow table attacks slower.

Office 2016 uses, by default, 256-bit AES, the SHA-2 hash algorithm, 16 bytes of salt and CBC (cipher block chaining).

Attacks that target the password include dictionary attacks, rule-based attacks, brute-force attacks, mask attacks and statistics-based attacks. Attacks can be sped up through multiple CPUs, also in the cloud, and GPGPU (applicable only to Office 2007-10 documents).

== Excel worksheets and macro protection ==
The protection for worksheets and macros is necessarily weaker than that for the entire workbook, as the software itself must be able to display or use them.

For XLSX files that can be opened but not edited, there is another attack. As the file format is a group of XML files within a ZIP; unzipping, editing, and replacing the workbook.xml file (and/or the individual worksheet XML files) with identical copies in which the unknown key and salt are replaced with a known pair or removed altogether allows the sheets to be edited.
