= Lyra2 =

Key derivative function

Lyra2 is a password hashing scheme (PHS) that can also function as a key derivation function (KDF). It gained recognition during the Password Hashing Competition in July 2015, which was won by Argon2. It is also used in proof-of-work algorithms such as Lyra2REv2, adopted by Vertcoin and MonaCoin, among other cryptocurrencies.

Lyra2 was designed by Marcos A. Simplicio Jr., Leonardo C. Almeida, Ewerton R. Andrade, Paulo C. F. dos Santos, and Paulo S. L. M. Barreto from Escola Politécnica da Universidade de São Paulo. It is based on Lyra, which had been created by the same team. Lyra2 includes:

- The ability to configure the desired amount of memory, processing time, and parallelism for the algorithm.
- High memory usage with processing time similar to scrypt.

In addition, it:

- Provides higher security against time-memory trade-offs.
- Allows legitimate users to better benefit from the parallelism capabilities of their own platforms.
- Increases the costs of creating dedicated hardware to attack the algorithm.
- Balances resistance against side-channel threats and attacks using cheaper, slower storage devices.

Lyra2 is released into the public domain.

== Design ==
As any PHS, Lyra2 takes as input a salt and a password, creating a pseudorandom output that can then be used as key material for cryptographic algorithms or as an authentication string.

Internally, the scheme's memory is organized as a matrix that is expected to remain in memory during the whole password hashing process. Since its cells are iteratively read and written, discarding a cell for saving memory leads to the need of recomputing it whenever it is accessed once again, until the point it was last modified.

The construction and visitation of the matrix is done using a stateful combination of the absorbing, squeezing and duplexing operations of the underlying sponge (i.e., its internal state is never reset to zero), ensuring the sequential nature of the whole process.

Also, the number of times the matrix's cells are revisited after initialization is defined by the user, allowing Lyra2's execution time to be fine-tuned according to the target platform's resources.

=== Inputs ===
- password
- salt
- t_cost - execution time
- m_cost - memory required
- outlen

The algorithm additionally enables parameterization in terms of:

- degree of parallelism (number of threads $p$)
- underlying permutation function (can be seen as the main cryptographic primitive)
- number of blocks used by the underlying permutation function (bitrate)
- number of rounds performed for the underlying permutation function ($\rho$)
- number of bits to be used in rotations ($\omega$)
- output length($\kappa$)

=== Functions/symbols ===
||
Concatenate two strings
^
Bitwise XOR
[+]
Word wise add operation (i.e., ignoring carries between words)
%
Modulus
W
The target machine's word size (usually, 32 or 64)
omega
Number of bits to be used in rotations (recommended: a multiple of the machine's word size, W)
>>>
Right rotation
rho
Number of rounds for reduced squeeze or duplexing operations
blen
Sponge's block size in bytes
H or H_i
Sponge with block size blen (in bytes) and underlying permutation f
H.absorb(input)
Sponge's absorb operation on input
H.squeeze(len)
Sponge's squeeze operation of len bytes
H.squeeze_{rho}(len)
Sponge's squeeze operation of len bytes using rho rounds of f
H.duplexing(input,len)
Sponge's duplexing operation on input, producing len bytes
H.duplexing_{rho}(input,len)
Sponge's duplexing operation on input, using rho rounds of f, producing len bytes
pad(string)
Pads a string to a multiple of blen bytes (padding rule: 10*1)
lsw(input)
The least significant word of input
len(string)
Length of a string, in bytes
syncThreads()
Synchronize parallel threads
swap(input1,input2)
Swap the value of two inputs
C
Number of columns on the memory matrix (usually, 64, 128, 256, 512 or 1024)
P
Degree of parallelism (P >= 1 and (m_cost/2) % P == 0)

=== Algorithm without parallelism ===
** Bootstrapping phase: Initializes the sponge's state and local variables
# Byte representation of input parameters (others can be added)
params =  outlen || len(password) || len(salt) || t_cost || m_cost || C

# Initializes the sponge's state (after that, password can be overwritten)
H.absorb( pad(password || salt || params) )

# Initializes visitation step, window and first rows that will feed 
gap = 1
stp = 1
wnd = 2
sqrt = 2

prev0 = 2
row1 = 1
prev1 = 0

  - Setup phase: Initializes a (m_cost x C) memory matrix, its cells having blen-byte cells
1. Initializes M[0], M[1] and M[2]
for col = 0 to C-1 M[0][C-1-col] = H.squeeze_{rho}(blen) for col = 0 to C-1 M[1][C-1-col] = H.duplexing_{rho}( M[0][col], blen) for col = 0 to C-1 M[2][C-1-col] = H.duplexing_{rho}( M[1][col], blen)
1. Filling Loop: initializes remainder rows
for row0 = 3 to m_cost-1 # Columns Loop: M[row0] is initialized and M[row1] is updated for col = 0 to C-1 rand = H.duplexing_{rho}( M[row1][col] [+] M[prev0][col] [+] M[prev1][col], blen) M[row0][C-1-col] = M[prev0][col] ^ rand M[row1][col] = M[row1][col] ^ ( rand >>> omega ) # Rows to be revisited in next loop prev0 = row0 prev1 = row1 row1 = (row1 + stp) % wnd # Window fully revisited if (row1 = 0) # Doubles window and adjusts step wnd = 2 * wnd stp = sqrt + gap gap = -gap # Doubles sqrt every other iteration if (gap = -1) sqrt = 2 * sqrt
  - Wandering phase: Iteratively overwrites pseudorandom cells of the memory matrix
1. Visitation Loop: (2 * m_cost * t_cost) rows revisited in pseudorandom fashion
for wCount = 0 to ( (m_cost * t_cost) - 1) # Picks pseudorandom rows row0 = lsw(rand) % m_cost row1 = lsw( rand >>> omega ) % m_cost # Columns Loop: updates both M[row0] and M[row1] for col = 0 to C-1 # Picks pseudorandom columns col0 = lsw( ( rand >>> omega ) >>> omega ) % C col1 = lsw( ( ( rand >>> omega ) >>> omega ) >>> omega ) % C rand = H.duplexing_{rho}( M[row0][col] [+] M[row1][col] [+] M[prev0][col0] [+] M[prev1][col1], blen) M[row0][col] = M[row0][col] ^ rand M[row1][col] = M[row1][col] ^ ( rand >>> omega ) # Next iteration revisits most recently updated rows prev0 = row0 prev1 = row1
  - Wrap-up phase: output computation
1. Absorbs a final column with a full-round sponge
H.absorb( M[row0][0] )
1. Squeezes outlen bits with a full-round sponge
output = H.squeeze(outlen)
1. Provides outlen-long bitstring as output
return output

=== Algorithm with parallelism ===
for each i in [0..P]
	** Bootstrapping phase: Initializes the sponge's state and local variables
	
	# Byte representation of input parameters (others can be added)
	params =  outlen || len(password) || len(salt) || t_cost || m_cost || C || P || i

	# Initializes the sponge's state (after that, password can be overwritten)
	H_i.absorb( pad(password || salt || params) )

	# Initializes visitation step, window and first rows that will feed 
	gap = 1
	stp = 1
	wnd = 2
	sqrt = 2
	sync = 4
	j = i

	prev0 = 2
	rowP = 1
	prevP = 0

	** Setup phase: Initializes a (m_cost x C) memory matrix, its cells having blen-byte cells

	# Initializes M_i[0], M_i[1] and M_i[2]
	for col = 0 to C-1
		M_i[0][C-1-col] = H_i.squeeze_{rho}(blen)
	for col = 0 to C-1
		M_i[1][C-1-col] = H_i.duplexing_{rho}( M_i[0][col], blen)
	for col = 0 to C-1
		M_i[2][C-1-col] = H_i.duplexing_{rho}( M_i[1][col], blen)

	# Filling Loop: initializes remainder rows
	for row0 = 3 to ( (m_cost / P) - 1 )
		# Columns Loop: M_i[row0] is initialized and M_j[row1] is updated
		for col = 0 to C-1
			rand = H_i.duplexing_{rho}( M_j[rowP][col] [+] M_i[prev0][col] [+] M_j[prevP][col], blen)
			M_i[row0][C-1-col] = M_i[prev0][col] ^ rand
			M_j[rowP][col] = M_j[rowP][col] ^ ( rand >>> omega )

		# Rows to be revisited in next loop
		prev0 = row0
		prevP = rowP
		rowP = (rowP + stp) % wnd

		# Window fully revisited
		if (rowP = 0)
			# Doubles window and adjusts step
			wnd = 2 * wnd
			stp = sqrt + gap
			gap = -gap
		
			# Doubles sqrt every other iteration
			if (gap = -1)
				sqrt = 2 * sqrt
		
		# Synchronize point
		if (row0 = sync)
			sync = sync + (sqrt / 2)
			j = (j + 1) % P
			syncThreads()

	syncThreads()
	
	** Wandering phase: Iteratively overwrites pseudorandom cells of the memory matrix

	wnd = m_cost / (2 * P)
	sync = sqrt
	off0 = 0
	offP = wnd

	# Visitation Loop: (2 * m_cost * t_cost / P) rows revisited in pseudorandom fashion
	for wCount = 0 to ( ( (m_cost * t_cost) / P) - 1)
		# Picks pseudorandom rows and slices (j)
		row0 = off0 + (lsw(rand) % wnd)
		rowP = offP + (lsw( rand >>> omega ) % wnd)
		j = lsw( ( rand >>> omega ) >>> omega ) % P

		# Columns Loop: update M_i[row0]
		for col = 0 to C-1
			# Picks pseudorandom column	
			col0 = lsw( ( ( rand >>> omega ) >>> omega ) >>> omega ) % C

			rand = H_i.duplexing_{rho}( M_i[row0][col] [+] M_i[prev0][col0] [+] M_j[rowP][col], blen)
			M_i[row0][col] = M_i[row0][col] ^ rand

		# Next iteration revisits most recently updated rows
		prev0 = row0
		
		# Synchronize point
		if (wCount = sync)
			sync = sync + sqrt
			swap(off0,offP)
			syncThreads()

	syncThreads()

	** Wrap-up phase: output computation

	# Absorbs a final column with a full-round sponge
	H_i.absorb( M_i[row0][0] )

	# Squeezes outlen bits with a full-round sponge
	output_i = H_i.squeeze(outlen)

# Provides outlen-long bitstring as output
return output_0 ^ ... ^ output_{P-1}

== Security analysis ==
Against Lyra2, the processing cost of attacks using $1/2^{n+2}$ of the amount of memory employed by a legitimate user is expected to be between $O(2^{2nT}R^{3})$ and $O(2^{2nT}R^{n+2})$, the latter being a better estimate for $n \gg 1$, instead of the $O(R)$ achieved when the amount of memory is $O(R)$, where $T$ is a user-defined parameter to define a processing time.

This compares well to Scrypt, which displays a cost of $O(R^{2})$ when the memory usage is high$O(1)$, and with other solutions in the literature, for which the results are usually $O(R^{T+1})$.

Nonetheless, in practice these solutions usually involve a value of $R$ (memory usage) lower than those attained with the Lyra2 for the same processing time.

== Performance ==
Performance of SSE-enabled Lyra2, for C = 256, ρ = 1, p = 1, and different T and R settings, compared with SSE-enabled Scrypt and memory-hard PHC finalists with minimum parameters.

The processing time obtained with an SSE single-core implementation of Lyra2 is illustrated in the hereby shown figure. This figure was extracted from, and is very similar to, third-party benchmarks performed during the PHC context.

The results depicted correspond to the average execution time of Lyra2 configured with $C=256$, $\rho=1$, $b=768$ bits (i.e., the inner state has 256 bits), and different $T$ and $R$ settings, giving an overall idea of possible combinations of parameters and the corresponding usage of resources.

As shown in this figure, Lyra2 is able to execute in: less than 1 s while using up to 400 MB (with $R = 2^{14}$ and $T=5$) or up to 1 GB of memory (with $R \approx 4.2\cdot10^{4}$ and $T=1$); or in less than 5 s with 1.6 GB (with $R = 2^{16}$ and $T=6$).

All tests were performed on an Intel Xeon E5-2430 (2.20 GHz with 12 Cores, 64 bits) equipped with 48 GB of DRAM, running Ubuntu 14.04 LTS 64 bits, and the source code was compiled using GCC 4.9.2.

== Extensions ==
Lyra offers two main extensions:

- Lyra2-δ: Provides more control over the algorithm's bandwidth usage.
- Lyra2p: Takes advantage of parallelism capabilities on the user's platform.

== See also ==
- crypt (C)
- yescrypt
- Password hashing
- Password Hashing Competition
