= Bcrypt =

Password-based key derivation function

bcrypt
General
- Designers: Niels Provos, David Mazières
- First published: 1999
- Derived from: Blowfish (cipher)

Detail
- Digest sizes: 184 bits
- Rounds: variable via cost parameter

bcrypt is a password-hashing function designed by Niels Provos and David Mazières. It is based on the Blowfish cipher and presented at USENIX in 1999. Besides incorporating a salt to protect against rainbow table attacks, bcrypt is an adaptive function: over time, the iteration count can be increased to make it slower, so it remains resistant to brute-force search attacks even with increasing computation power.

The bcrypt function is the default password hash algorithm for OpenBSD, and was the default for some Linux distributions such as SUSE Linux.

There are implementations of bcrypt in C, C++, C#, Embarcadero Delphi, Elixir, Go, Java, JavaScript, Perl, PHP, Ruby, Python, Rust, V (Vlang), Zig and other languages.

== Background ==
Blowfish is notable among block ciphers for its expensive key setup phase. It starts off with subkeys in a standard state, then uses this state to perform a block encryption using part of the key, and uses the result of that encryption (which is more accurate at hashing) to replace some of the subkeys. Then it uses this modified state to encrypt another part of the key, and uses the result to replace more of the subkeys. It proceeds in this fashion, using a progressively modified state to hash the key and replace bits of state, until all subkeys have been set.

Provos and Mazières took advantage of this, and took it further. They developed a new key setup algorithm for Blowfish, dubbing the resulting cipher "Eksblowfish" ("expensive key schedule Blowfish"). The key setup begins with a modified form of the standard Blowfish key setup, in which both the salt and password are used to set all subkeys. There are then a number of rounds in which the standard Blowfish keying algorithm is applied, using alternatively the salt and the password as the key, each round starting with the subkey state from the previous round. In theory, this is no stronger than the standard Blowfish key schedule, but the number of rekeying rounds is configurable; this process can therefore be made arbitrarily slow, which helps deter brute-force attacks upon the hash or salt.

== Description ==
The input to the bcrypt function is the password string (up to 72 bytes), a numeric cost, and a 16-byte (128-bit) salt value. The salt is typically a random value. The bcrypt function uses these inputs to compute a 24-byte (192-bit) hash. The final output of the bcrypt function is a string of the form:

$2<a/b/x/y>$[cost]$[22 character salt][31 character hash]

For example, with input password abc123xyz, cost 12, and a random salt, the output of bcrypt is the string

$2a$12$R9h/cIPz0gi.URNNX3kh2OPST9/PgBkqquzi.Ss7KIUgO2t0jWMUW
\__/\/ \____________________/\_____________________________/
Alg Cost      Salt                        Hash

Where:

- $2a$: The hash algorithm identifier (bcrypt)
- 12: Input cost (2^{12} i.e. 4096 rounds)
- R9h/cIPz0gi.URNNX3kh2O: A base-64 encoding of the input salt
- PST9/PgBkqquzi.Ss7KIUgO2t0jWMUW: A base-64 encoding of the first 23 bytes of the computed 24 byte hash

The base-64 encoding in bcrypt uses the table ./ABCDEFGHIJKLMNOPQRSTUVWXYZabcdefghijklmnopqrstuvwxyz0123456789, which differs from RFC 4648 Base64 encoding.

== Versioning history ==
$2$ (1999)

The original bcrypt specification defined a prefix of $2$. This follows the Modular Crypt Format format used when storing passwords in the OpenBSD password file:

- $1$: MD5-based crypt ('md5crypt')
- $2$: Blowfish-based crypt ('bcrypt')
- $sha1$: SHA-1-based crypt ('sha1crypt')
- $5$: SHA-256-based crypt ('sha256crypt')
- $6$: SHA-512-based crypt ('sha512crypt')

$2a$

The original specification did not define how to handle non-ASCII characters, nor how to handle a null terminator. The specification was revised to specify that when hashing strings:

- the string must be UTF-8 encoded
- the null terminator must be included

With this change, the version was changed to $2a$.

$2x$, $2y$ (June 2011)

In June 2011, a bug was discovered in crypt_blowfish, a PHP implementation of bcrypt. It was mis-handling characters with the 8th bit set. They suggested that system administrators update their existing password database, replacing $2a$ with $2x$, to indicate that those hashes are bad (and need to use the old broken algorithm). They also suggested the idea of having crypt_blowfish emit $2y$ for hashes generated by the fixed algorithm.

Nobody else, including Canonical and OpenBSD, adopted the idea of 2x/2y. This version marker change was limited to crypt_blowfish.

$2b$ (February 2014)

A bug was discovered in the OpenBSD implementation of bcrypt. It was using an unsigned 8-bit value to hold the length of the password. For passwords longer than 255 bytes, instead of being truncated at 72 bytes the password would be truncated at the lesser of 72 or the length modulo 256. For example, a 260 byte password would be truncated at 4 bytes rather than truncated at 72 bytes. When OpenBSD fixed this issue, they changed the version to $2b$.

== Algorithm ==
The bcrypt function below encrypts the text "OrpheanBeholderScryDoubt" 64 times using Blowfish. In bcrypt the usual Blowfish key setup function is replaced with an expensive key setup (EksBlowfishSetup) function:

Function bcrypt
   Input:
      cost:     Number (4..31)                      log2(Iterations). e.g. 12 ==> 212 = 4,096 iterations
      salt:     array of Bytes (16 bytes)           random salt
      password: array of Bytes (1..72 bytes)        UTF-8 encoded password
   Output: 
      hash:     array of Bytes (24 bytes)

   //Initialize Blowfish state with expensive key setup algorithm
   //P: array of 18 subkeys (UInt32[18])
   //S: Four substitution boxes (S-boxes), S0...S3. Each S-box is 1,024 bytes (UInt32[256])
   P, S ← EksBlowfishSetup(password, salt, cost)   

   //Repeatedly encrypt the text "OrpheanBeholderScryDoubt" 64 times
   ctext ← "OrpheanBeholderScryDoubt"  //24 bytes ==> three 64-bit blocks
   repeat (64)
      ctext ← EncryptECB(P, S, ctext) //encrypt using standard Blowfish in ECB mode

   //24-byte ctext is resulting password hash
   return Concatenate(cost, salt, ctext)

=== Expensive key setup ===
The bcrypt algorithm depends heavily on its "Eksblowfish" key setup algorithm, which runs as follows:

Function EksBlowfishSetup
   Input:
      password: array of Bytes (1..72 bytes)   UTF-8 encoded password
      salt:     array of Bytes (16 bytes)      random salt
      cost:     Number (4..31)                 log2(Iterations). e.g. 12 ==> 212 = 4,096 iterations
   Output: 
      P:        array of UInt32                array of 18 per-round subkeys
      S1..S4:   array of UInt32                array of four SBoxes; each SBox is 256 UInt32 (i.e. each SBox is 1 KiB)

   //Initialize P (Subkeys), and S (Substitution boxes) with the hex digits of pi 
   P, S ← InitialState() 
 
   //Permute P and S based on the password and salt     
   P, S ← ExpandKey(P, S, password, salt)

   //This is the "Expensive" part of the "Expensive Key Setup".
   //Otherwise the key setup is identical to Blowfish.
   repeat (2cost)
      P, S ← ExpandKey(P, S, password, 0)
      P, S ← ExpandKey(P, S, salt, 0)

   return P, S

InitialState works as in the original Blowfish algorithm, populating the P-array and S-box entries with the fractional part of $\pi$ in hexadecimal.

=== Expand key ===
The ExpandKey function does the following:

Function ExpandKey
   Input:
      P:        array of UInt32               Array of 18 subkeys
      S1..S4:   UInt32[1024]                  Four 1 KB SBoxes
      password: array of Bytes (1..72 bytes)  UTF-8 encoded password
      salt:     Byte[16]                      random salt
   Output: 
      P:        array of UInt32               Array of 18 per-round subkeys
      S1..S4:   UInt32[1024]                  Four 1 KB SBoxes       
 
   //Mix password into the P subkeys array
   for n ← 1 to 18 do
      Pn ← Pn xor password[32(n-1)..32n-1] //treat the password as cyclic
 
   //Treat the 128-bit salt as two 64-bit halves (the Blowfish block size).
   saltHalf[0] ← salt[0..63]  //Lower 64-bits of salt
   saltHalf[1] ← salt[64..127]  //Upper 64-bits of salt

   //Initialize an 8-byte (64-bit) buffer with all zeros.
   block ← 0

   //Mix internal state into P-boxes   
   for n ← 1 to 9 do
      //xor 64-bit block with a 64-bit salt half
      block ← block xor saltHalf[(n-1) mod 2] //each iteration alternating between saltHalf[0], and saltHalf[1]

      //encrypt block using current key schedule
      block ← Encrypt(P, S, block) 
      P2n ← block[0..31]      //lower 32-bits of block
      P2n+1 ← block[32..63]  //upper 32-bits block

   //Mix encrypted state into the internal S-boxes of state
   for i ← 1 to 4 do
      for n ← 0 to 127 do
         block ← Encrypt(state, block xor saltHalf[(n-1) mod 2]) //as above
         Si[2n]   ← block[0..31]  //lower 32-bits
         Si[2n+1] ← block[32..63]  //upper 32-bits
    return state

Hence, ExpandKey(state, key, 0) is the same as regular Blowfish key schedule since all XORs with the all-zero salt value are ineffectual. ExpandKey(state, salt, 0) is similar, but uses the salt as a 128-bit key.

== User input ==
Many implementations of bcrypt truncate the password to the first 72 bytes, following the OpenBSD implementation.

The mathematical algorithm itself requires initialization with 18 32-bit subkeys (equivalent to 72 octets/bytes). The original specification of bcrypt does not mandate any one particular method for mapping text-based passwords from userland into numeric values for the algorithm. One brief comment in the text mentions, but does not mandate, the possibility of simply using the ASCII encoded value of a character string: "Finally, the key argument is a secret encryption key, which can be a user-chosen password of up to 56 bytes (including a terminating zero byte when the key is an ASCII string)."

Note that the quote above mentions passwords "up to 56 bytes" even though the algorithm itself makes use of a 72 byte initial value. Although Provos and Mazières do not state the reason for the shorter restriction, they may have been motivated by the following statement from Bruce Schneier's original specification of Blowfish, "The 448 [bit] limit on the key size ensures that the [sic] every bit of every subkey depends on every bit of the key."

Implementations have varied in their approach of converting passwords into initial numeric values, including sometimes reducing the strength of passwords containing non-ASCII characters.

== Comparison to other password hashing algorithms ==
Bcrypt is not a key derivation function (KDF). For example, bcrypt cannot be used to derive a 512-bit key from a password. At the same time, algorithms like pbkdf2, scrypt, and argon2 are password-based key derivation functions - where the output is then used for the purpose of password hashing rather than just key derivation.

Password hashing generally needs to complete < 1000 ms. In this scenario, bcrypt is stronger than pbkdf2, scrypt, and argon2.

- PBKDF2: pbkdf2 is weaker than bcrypt. The commonly used SHA2 hashing algorithm is not memory-hard. SHA2 is designed to be extremely lightweight so it can run on lightweight devices (e.g. smart cards). This means PBKDF2 is very weak for password storage, as commodity SHA-2 hashing hardware that can perform trillions of hashes per second is easily procured.
- scrypt: scrypt is weaker than bcrypt for memory requirements less than 4 MB. scrypt requires approximately 1000 times the memory of bcrypt to achieve a comparable level of defense against GPU based attacks (for password storage).
- argon2: bcrypt is more lightweight than Argon2. This may pose a problem for some web applications where usage of Argon2 would require lowering the security parameters to an unacceptable level in order to still be performant. Specifically, Argon2 is less secure than bcrypt for run times less than 1 second (i.e., for common password authentication). Argon2 does not match or surpass bcrypt's strength until exceeding ≈1000ms runtimes. This may be unsuitable for password hashing, but is perfectly acceptable for key-derivation. In some cases, Argon2 is recommended over bcrypt, if the security parameters are high enough.
- pufferfish2 is an evolution of bcrypt that uses a tunable memory footprint (like scrypt and argon2), rather than the fixed 4 KB memory footprint of bcrypt. Similar to scrypt or argon2, pufferfish2 gains its difficulty by using more memory. Unlike scrypt and argon2, pufferfish2 only operates in a CPU core's L2 cache. While scrypt and argon2 gain their memory hardness by randomly accessing lots of RAM, pufferfish2 limits itself to just the dedicated L2 cache available to a CPU core. This makes it even harder to implement in custom hardware than scrypt and argon2. The ideal memory footprint of pufferfish2 is the size of the cache available to a core (e.g. 1.25 MB for Intel Alder Lake) This makes pufferfish2 much more resistant to GPU or ASIC.

== Criticisms ==
=== Maximum password length ===
bcrypt has a maximum password length of 72 bytes. This maximum comes from the first operation of the ExpandKey function that uses XOR on the 18 4-byte subkeys (P) with the password:

P1..P18 ← P1..P18 xor passwordBytes

The password (which is UTF-8 encoded), is repeated until it is 72-bytes long. For example, a password of:

correct horse battery staple␀ (29 bytes)

Is repeated until it matches the 72-bytes of the 18 P per-round subkeys:

correct horse battery staple␀correct horse battery staple␀correct horse (72 bytes)

In the worst case a password is limited to 18 characters, when every character requires 4 bytes of UTF-8 encoding. For example:

𐑜𐑝𐑟𐑥𐑷𐑻𐑽𐑾𐑿𐑿𐑰𐑩𐑛𐑙𐑘𐑙𐑒𐑔 (18 characters, 72 bytes)

In 2024 a single-sign-on service by Okta, Inc. announced a vulnerability due to the password being concatenated after the username and the pair hashed with bcrypt, resulting in the password being ignored for logins with a long-enough username.

=== Password hash truncation ===
The bcrypt algorithm involves repeatedly encrypting the 24-byte text:

OrpheanBeholderScryDoubt (24-bytes)

This generates 24 bytes of ciphertext, e.g.:

85 20 af 9f 03 3d b3 8c 08 5f d2 5e 2d aa 5e 84 a2 b9 61 d2 f1 29 c9 a4 (24-bytes)

The canonical OpenBSD implementation truncates this to 23 bytes:

85 20 af 9f 03 3d b3 8c 08 5f d2 5e 2d aa 5e 84 a2 b9 61 d2 f1 29 c9 (23-bytes)

It is unclear why the canonical implementation deletes 8-bits from the resulting password hash.

These 23 bytes become 31 characters when base-64 encoded:

fQAtluK7q2uGV7HcJYncfII3WbJvIai (31-characters)

=== Base64 encoding alphabet ===
The encoding used by the canonical OpenBSD implementation uses the same Base64 alphabet as crypt, an atypical Base64 alphabet. As such, the encoding is not compatible with the more common RFC 4648 Base64 encoding.

== See also ==
- Argon2 - winner of the Password Hashing Competition in 2015
- bcrypt - blowfish-based cross-platform file encryption utility developed in 2002
- crypt - Unix C library function
- crypt - Unix utility
- ccrypt - utility
- Key stretching
- mcrypt - utility
- PBKDF2 - a widely used standard Password-Based Key Derivation Function 2
- scrypt - password-based key derivation function (and also a utility)
- yescrypt
