= Password-based cryptography =

Password-based cryptography is the study of password-based key encryption, decryption, and authorization. It generally refers two distinct classes of methods:

- Single-party methods
- Multi-party methods

== Single party methods ==
Some systems attempt to derive a cryptographic key directly from a password. However, such practice is generally ill-advised when there is a threat of brute-force attack. Techniques to mitigate such attack include passphrases and iterated (deliberately slow) password-based key derivation functions such as PBKDF2 (RFC 2898).

== Multi-party methods ==
Password-authenticated key agreement systems allow two or more parties that agree on a password (or password-related data) to derive shared keys without exposing the password or keys to network attack. Earlier generations of challenge–response authentication systems have also been used with passwords, but these have generally been subject to eavesdropping and/or brute-force attacks on the password.

== See also ==
- Password
- Passphrase
- Password-authenticated key agreement
