= List of PBKDF2 implementations =

List of software that implements or uses the PBKDF2 key derivation standard.

== Implementations ==
- wolfSSL
- Libgcrypt
- Bash implementation
- Crypto-JS Javascript implementation
- openssl's C implementation
- OpenBSD's C implementation
- PolarSSL's C implementation
- CyaSSL's C implementation
- ActionScript 3.0 implementation
- .NET Framework's implementation
- Delphi/Free Pascal implementation
- Erlang implementation
- Go implementation
- PBKDF2 for Haxe
- JavaScript implementations slow, less slow, fast, benchmark
- Java implementation (PBKDF2WithHmacSHA256)
- Python implementation
- Python standard library
- Perl implementation (large), (small), (tiny), Native Perl Implementation – no dependency hell
- Ruby's standard library
- Ruby implementation
- Rust implementation
- REBOL2 implementation
- PHP implementations: native (added in v5.5.0), pure PHP implementation
- Scala implementation
- Common Lisp implementation (Ironclad)
- Web Cryptography API

== Systems that use PBKDF2 ==
- GNU GRUB to protect the bootloader password
- Wi-Fi Protected Access (WPA and WPA2) used to secure Wi-Fi wireless networks
- Microsoft Windows Data Protection API (DPAPI)
- OpenDocument encryption used in OpenOffice.org
- WinZip's AES Encryption scheme.
- Keeper for password hashing.
- LastPass for password hashing.
- 1Password for password hashing.
- Enpass for password hashing.
- Dashlane for password hashing.
- Bitwarden for password hashing.
- Apple's iOS mobile operating system, for protecting user passcodes and passwords.
- Mac OS X Mountain Lion for user passwords
- The Django web framework, as of release 1.4.
- The Odoo ERP platform
- The MODX content management framework, as of version 2.0.
- The encryption and decryption schema of Zend Framework, to generate encryption and authentication keys.
- Cisco IOS and IOS XE Type 4 password hashes
- Firefox Sync for client-side password stretching

=== Disk encryption software ===
- Filesystem encryption in the Android operating system, as of version 3.0.
- FileVault (Mac OS X) from Apple Computer
- FreeOTFE (Windows and Pocket PC PDAs); also supports mounting Linux (e.g. LUKS) volumes under Windows
- LUKS (Linux Unified Key Setup) (Linux)
- TrueCrypt (Windows, Linux, and Mac OS X)
- VeraCrypt (Windows, Linux, FreeBSD, and Mac OS X)
- CipherShed (Windows, Linux, and Mac OS X)
- GEOM ELI module for FreeBSD
- EncFS (Linux, FreeBSD and Mac OS X) since v1.5.0
- GRUB2 (boot loader)
