= Vipw =

vipw is a small computer program which enables a Unix system administrator to safely and securely edit user or group-related files while setting a proper lock to prevent other users from modifying them until they are saved by the current user.

The following is the list of user and group files that can be modified by the vipw utility.

- “/etc/passwd“: User account information.
- “/etc/shadow“: Secure user account information.
- “/etc/group“: Group account information.
- “/etc/gshadow“: Secure group account information.

This way, you can edit the system files securely using your favorite editor set to the $VISUAL or $EDITOR environment variable, instead of accessing them directly from the CLI editor like GNU Nano or VIM, which is insecure.
