= Yescrypt =

Password-based key derivation function

yescrypt is a cryptographic key derivation function used for password hashing on Fedora Linux, Debian, Ubuntu, and Arch Linux. The function is more resistant to offline password-cracking attacks than SHA-512. It is based on scrypt.

It was designed by Alexander Peslyak, also known as Solar Designer, to be highly resistant to hardware-accelerated brute-force attacks. It features enhanced memory-hardness and "strongly sequential" processing, which reduces the threat of large-scale cracking attempts using GPUs, FPGAs, and ASICs. Attacks that rely on parallelization are made more resource-intensive by yescrypt requiring a substantial amount of RAM to compute a single hash. These security benefits and its scalability have led to its adoption as the default password-hashing scheme for several major Linux distributions, where it is identifiable in the /etc/shadow file by the $y$ prefix.

== See also ==
- crypt (C)
- Lyra2
- Password hashing
- Password Hashing Competition
