= Salt (cryptography) =

Random data used as an additional input to a hash function

In cryptography, a salt is random data fed as an additional input to a one-way function that hashes data, a password or passphrase. Salting helps defend against attacks that use partially precomputed tables (e.g. rainbow tables) or dictionaries of hashed values of commonly used passwords, by vastly growing the size of table needed for a successful attack. It also helps protect passwords that occur multiple times in a database, as a new salt is used for each password instance. Additionally, salting does not place any burden on users.

Typically, a unique salt is randomly generated for each password. The salt and the password (or its version after key stretching) are concatenated and fed to a cryptographic hash function, and the output hash value is then stored with the salt in a database. The salt does not need to be encrypted, because knowing the salt would not help the attacker.

Salting is broadly used in cybersecurity, from Unix system credentials to Internet security.

Salts are related to cryptographic nonces.

== Example ==
Without a salt, identical passwords will map to identical hash values, which could make it easier for a hacker to guess the passwords from their hash values.

Username	String to be hashed	Hashed value = SHA256
user1	password123	EF92B778BAFE771E89245B89ECBC08A44A4E166C06659911881F383D4473E94F
user2	password123	EF92B778BAFE771E89245B89ECBC08A44A4E166C06659911881F383D4473E94F

Instead, a salt is generated and appended to each password, which causes the resultant hash to output different values for the same original password.

Username	Salt value	String to be hashed	Hashed value = SHA256 (Password + Salt value)
user1	D;%yL9TS:5PalS/d	password123D;%yL9TS:5PalS/d	9C9B913EB1B6254F4737CE947EFD16F16E916F9D6EE5C1102A2002E48D4C88BD
user2	)<,-<U(jLezy4j>*	password123)<,-<U(jLezy4j>*	6058B4EB46BD6487298B59440EC8E70EAE482239FF2B4E7CA69950DFBD5532F2

The salt and hash are then stored in the database. To later test if a password a user enters is correct, the same process can be performed on it (appending that user's salt to the password and calculating the resultant hash): if the result does not match the stored hash, it could not have been the correct password that was entered.

In practice, a salt is usually generated using a cryptographically secure pseudorandom number generator (CSPRNG). CSPRNGs are designed to produce unpredictable random numbers which can be alphanumeric. While generally discouraged due to lower security, some systems use timestamps or simple counters as a source of salt. Sometimes, a salt may be generated by combining a random value with additional information, such as a timestamp or user-specific data, to ensure uniqueness across different systems or time periods.

== Common mistakes ==
=== Salt re-use ===
Using the same salt for all passwords is dangerous because a precomputed table which simply accounts for the salt will render the salt useless. However, see Pepper.

Generation of precomputed tables for databases with unique salts for every password is not viable because of the computational cost of doing so. But, if a common salt is used for all the entries, creating such a table (that accounts for the salt) then becomes a viable and possibly successful attack.

Because salt re-use can cause users with the same password to have the same hash, cracking a single hash can result in other passwords being compromised too.

=== Salt length ===
If a salt is too short, an attacker may precompute a table of every possible salt appended to every likely password. Using a long salt ensures such a table would be prohibitively large. 16 bytes (128 bits) or more is generally sufficient to provide a large enough space of possible values, minimizing the risk of collisions (i.e., two different passwords ending up with the same salt).

== Benefits ==
To understand the difference between cracking a single password and a set of them, consider a file with users and their hashed passwords. Say the file is unsalted. Then an attacker could pick a string, call it attempt[0], and then compute hash(attempt[0]). A user whose hash stored in the file is hash(attempt[0]) may or may not have password attempt[0]. However, even if attempt[0] is not the user's actual password, it will be accepted as if it were, because the system can only check passwords by computing the hash of the password entered and comparing it to the hash stored in the file. Thus, each match cracks a user password, and the chance of a match rises with the number of passwords in the file. In contrast, if salts are used, the attacker would have to compute hash(attempt[0] || salt[a]), compare against entry A, then hash(attempt[0] || salt[b]), compare against entry B, and so on. This prevents any one attempt from cracking multiple passwords, given that salt re-use is avoided.

Salts also combat the use of precomputed tables for cracking passwords. Such a table might simply map common passwords to their hashes, or it might do something more complex, like store the start and end points of a set of precomputed hash chains. In either case, salting can defend against the use of precomputed tables by lengthening hashes and having them draw from larger character sets, making it less likely that the table covers the resulting hashes. In particular, a precomputed table would need to cover the string [salt + hash] rather than simply [hash].

The modern shadow password system, in which password hashes and other security data are stored in a non-public file, somewhat mitigates these concerns. However, they remain relevant in multi-server installations which use centralized password management systems to push passwords or password hashes to multiple systems. In such installations, the root account on each individual system may be treated as less trusted than the administrators of the centralized password system, so it remains worthwhile to ensure that the security of the password hashing algorithm, including the generation of unique salt values, is adequate.

Another (lesser) benefit of a salt is as follows: two users might choose the same string as their password. Without a salt, this password would be stored as the same hash string in the password file. This would disclose the fact that the two accounts have the same password, allowing anyone who knows one of the account's passwords to access the other account. By salting the passwords with two random characters, even if two accounts use the same password, no one can discover this just by reading hashes. Salting also makes it extremely difficult to determine if a person has used the same password for multiple systems.

== Unix implementations ==
=== 1970s–1980s ===
Earlier versions of Unix used a password file /etc/passwd to store the hashes of salted passwords (passwords prefixed with two-character random salts). In these older versions of Unix, the salt was also stored in the passwd file (as cleartext) together with the hash of the salted password. The password file was publicly readable for all users of the system. This was necessary so that user-privileged software tools could find user names and other information. The security of passwords is therefore protected only by the one-way functions (enciphering or hashing) used for the purpose. Early Unix implementations limited passwords to eight characters and used a 12-bit salt, which allowed for 4,096 possible salt values. This was an appropriate balance for 1970s computational and storage costs.

=== Since the 1980s ===
The shadow password system is used to limit access to hashes and salt. The salt is eight characters, the hash is 86 characters, and the password length is effectively unlimited, barring stack overflow errors.

== Web-application implementations ==
It is common for a web application to store in a database the hash value of a user's password. Without a salt, a successful SQL injection attack may yield easily crackable passwords. Because many users re-use passwords for multiple sites, the use of a salt is an important component of overall web application security. Some additional references for using a salt to secure password hashes in specific languages or libraries (PHP, the .NET libraries, etc.) can be found in the external links section below.

== See also ==
- Password cracking
- Cryptographic nonce
- Initialization vector
- Padding
- "Spice" in the Hasty Pudding cipher
- Rainbow tables
- Pepper (cryptography)
