= Argon2 =

2015 password-based key derivation function

General
- Designers: Alex Biryukov; Daniel Dinu; Dmitry Khovratovich
- First published: 2015; 11 years ago

Cipher detail
- Digest sizes: variable
- Block sizes: variable
- Rounds: variable

Argon2 is a key derivation function that was selected as the winner of the 2015 Password Hashing Competition. It was designed by Alex Biryukov, Daniel Dinu, and Dmitry Khovratovich from the University of Luxembourg. The reference implementation of Argon2 is released under a Creative Commons CC0 license (i.e. public domain) or the Apache License 2.0.

The Argon2 function uses a large, fixed-size memory region (often called the 'memory array' in documentation) to make brute-force attacks computationally expensive. The three variants differ in how they access this memory:

- Argon2d maximizes resistance to GPU cracking attacks. It accesses the memory array in a password-dependent order, which reduces the possibility of time–memory trade-off (TMTO) attacks, but introduces possible side-channel attacks.
- Argon2i is optimized to resist side-channel attacks. It accesses the memory array in a password-independent order.
- Argon2id is a hybrid version. It follows the Argon2i approach for the first half pass over memory and the Argon2d approach for subsequent passes. RFC 9106 recommends using Argon2id if one does not know the difference between the types or if side-channel attacks are considered to be a viable threat.

All three modes allow specification by three parameters that control:

- execution time
- memory required
- degree of parallelism

== Cryptanalysis ==
While there is no public cryptanalysis applicable to Argon2d, there are two published attacks on the Argon2i function. The first attack is applicable only to the old version of Argon2i, while the second has been extended to the latest version (1.3).

The first attack shows that it is possible to compute a single-pass Argon2i function using between a quarter and a fifth of the desired space with no time penalty, and compute a multiple-pass Argon2i using only N/e (≈ N/2.72) space with no time penalty. According to the Argon2 authors, this attack vector was fixed in version 1.3.

The second attack shows that Argon2i can be computed by an algorithm which has complexity O(n^{7/4} log(n)) for all choices of parameters σ (space cost), τ (time cost), and thread-count such that n=σ∗τ. The Argon2 authors claim that this attack is not efficient if Argon2i is used with three or more passes. However, Joël Alwen and Jeremiah Blocki improved the attack and showed that in order for the attack to fail, Argon2i v1.3 needs more than 10 passes over memory.

To address these concerns, RFC9106 recommends using Argon2id to largely mitigate such attacks.

== Algorithm ==
Function Argon2
   Inputs:
      password (P):       Bytes (0..232-1)    Password (or message) to be hashed
      salt (S):           Bytes (8..232-1)    Salt (16 bytes recommended for password hashing)
      parallelism (p):    Number (1..224-1)   Degree of parallelism (i.e. number of threads)
      tagLength (T):      Number (4..232-1)   Desired number of returned bytes
      memorySizeKB (m):   Number (8p..232-1)  Amount of memory (in kibibytes) to use
      iterations (t):     Number (1..232-1)   Number of iterations to perform
      version (v):        Number (0x13)     The current version is 0x13 (19 decimal)
      key (K):            Bytes (0..232-1)    Optional key (Errata: PDF says 0..32 bytes, RFC says 0..232 bytes)
      associatedData (X): Bytes (0..232-1)    Optional arbitrary extra data
      hashType (y):       Number (0=Argon2d, 1=Argon2i, 2=Argon2id)
   Output:
      tag:                Bytes (tagLength) The resulting generated bytes, tagLength bytes long

   Generate initial 64-byte block H0.
    All the input parameters are concatenated and input as a source of additional entropy.
    Errata: RFC says H0 is 64-bits; PDF says H0 is 64-bytes.
    Errata: RFC says the Hash is H^, the PDF says it's ℋ (but doesn't document what ℋ is). It's actually Blake2b.
    Variable length items are prepended with their length as 32-bit little-endian integers.
   buffer ← parallelism ∥ tagLength ∥ memorySizeKB ∥ iterations ∥ version ∥ hashType
         ∥ Length(password)       ∥ Password
         ∥ Length(salt)           ∥ salt
         ∥ Length(key)            ∥ key
         ∥ Length(associatedData) ∥ associatedData
   H0 ← Blake2b(buffer, 64) //default hash size of Blake2b is 64-bytes

   Calculate number of 1 KB blocks by rounding down memorySizeKB to the nearest multiple of 4*parallelism kibibytes
   blockCount ← Floor(memorySizeKB, 4*parallelism)

   Allocate two-dimensional array of 1 KiB blocks (parallelism rows x columnCount columns)
   columnCount ← blockCount / parallelism;   //In the RFC, columnCount is referred to as q

   Compute the first and second block (i.e. column zero and one) of each lane (i.e. row)
   for i ← 0 to parallelism-1 do for each row
      Bi[0] ← Hash(H0 ∥ 0 ∥ i, 1024) //Generate a 1024-byte digest
      Bi[1] ← Hash(H0 ∥ 1 ∥ i, 1024) //Generate a 1024-byte digest

   Compute remaining columns of each lane
   for i ← 0 to parallelism-1 do //for each row
      for j ← 2 to columnCount-1 do //for each subsequent column
         //i' and j' indexes depend if it's Argon2i, Argon2d, or Argon2id (See section 3.4)
         i′, j′ ← GetBlockIndexes(i, j)  //the GetBlockIndexes function is not defined
         Bi[j] = G(Bi[j-1], Bi′[j′]) //the G hash function is not defined

   Further passes when iterations > 1
   for nIteration ← 2 to iterations do
      for i ← 0 to parallelism-1 do for each row
        for j ← 0 to columnCount-1 do //for each subsequent column
           //i' and j' indexes depend if it's Argon2i, Argon2d, or Argon2id (See section 3.4)
           i′, j′ ← GetBlockIndexes(i, j)
           if j == 0 then 
             Bi[0] = Bi[0] xor G(Bi[columnCount-1], Bi′[j′])
           else
             Bi[j] = Bi[j] xor G(Bi[j-1], Bi′[j′])

   Compute final block C as the XOR of the last column of each row
   C ← B0[columnCount-1]
   for i ← 1 to parallelism-1 do
      C ← C xor Bi[columnCount-1]

   Compute output tag
   return Hash(C, tagLength)

=== Variable-length hash function ===
Argon2 makes use of a hash function capable of producing digests up to 2^{32} bytes long. This hash function is internally built upon Blake2.

{{#parsoid

== Recommended minimum parameters ==
The Request for Comments document standardizing Argon2, which was published in September 2021, recommends:

- Memory: 2 GiB, Iterations: 1, Parallelism: 4; for "a default setting for all environments"
- Memory: 64 MiB, Iterations: 3, Parallelism: 4; for "memory-constrained environments"
