= 40-bit encryption =

Key size for symmetric encryption

40-bit encryption refers to a (now broken) key size of forty bits, or five bytes, for symmetric encryption; this represents a relatively low level of security. A forty bit length corresponds to a total of 2^{40} possible keys. Although this is a large number in human terms (about a trillion), it is possible to break this degree of encryption using a moderate amount of computing power in a brute-force attack, i.e., trying out each possible key in turn.

== Description ==
A typical home computer in 2004 could brute-force a 40-bit key in a little under two weeks, testing a million keys per second; modern computers are able to achieve this much faster. Using free time on a large corporate network or a botnet would reduce the time in proportion to the number of computers available. With dedicated hardware, a 40-bit key can be broken in seconds. The Electronic Frontier Foundation's Deep Crack, built by a group of enthusiasts for US$250,000 in 1998, could break a 56-bit Data Encryption Standard (DES) key in days, and would be able to break 40-bit DES encryption in about two seconds.

40-bit encryption was common in software released before 1999, especially those based on the RC2 and RC4 algorithms which had special "7-day" export review policies, when algorithms with larger key lengths could not legally be exported from the United States without a case-by-case license. "In the early 1990s ... As a general policy, the State Department allowed exports of commercial encryption with 40-bit keys, although some software with DES could be exported to U.S.-controlled subsidiaries and financial institutions." As a result, the "international" versions of web browsers were designed to have an effective key size of 40 bits when using Secure Sockets Layer to protect e-commerce. Similar limitations were imposed on other software packages, including early versions of Wired Equivalent Privacy. In 1992, IBM designed the CDMF algorithm to reduce the strength of 56-bit DES against brute force attack to 40 bits, in order to create exportable DES implementations.

== Obsolescence ==
All 40-bit and 56-bit encryption algorithms are obsolete, because they are vulnerable to brute force attacks, and therefore cannot be regarded as secure. As a result, virtually all Web browsers now use 128-bit keys, which are considered strong. Most Web servers will not communicate with a client unless it has 128-bit encryption capability installed on it.

Public/private key pairs used in asymmetric encryption (public key cryptography), at least those based on prime factorization, must be much longer in order to be secure; see key size for more details.

As a general rule, modern symmetric encryption algorithms such as AES use key lengths of 128, 192 and 256 bits.

== See also ==
- 56-bit encryption
- Content Scramble System
