= Sean Murphy (cryptographer) =

Cryptographer

Sean Murphy is a cryptographer, currently a professor at Royal Holloway, University of London. He worked on the NESSIE and ECRYPT projects. His notable research includes the cryptanalysis of FEAL and the Advanced Encryption Standard, and the use of stochastic and statistical techniques in cryptology. With Donald Davies he also developed Davies' attack on DES.

Murphy received his Ph.D. in mathematics in 1989 from the University of Bath.
