= DES-X =

Block cipher

In cryptography, DES-X (or DESX) is a variant on the DES (Data Encryption Standard) symmetric-key block cipher intended to increase the complexity of a brute-force attack. The technique used to increase the complexity is called key whitening.

The original DES algorithm was specified in 1976 with a 56-bit key size: 2^{56} possibilities for the key. There was criticism that an exhaustive search might be within the capabilities of large governments, particularly the United States' National Security Agency (NSA). One scheme to increase the key size of DES without substantially altering the algorithm was DES-X, proposed by Ron Rivest in May 1984.

The algorithm has been included in RSA Security's BSAFE cryptographic library since the late 1980s.

DES-X augments DES by XORing an extra 64 bits of key (K_{1}) to the plaintext before applying DES, and then XORing another 64 bits of key (K_{2}) after the encryption:

$\mbox{DES-X}(M) = K_2 \oplus \mbox{DES}_K(M \oplus K_1)$

The key size is thereby increased to 56 + (2 × 64) = 184 bits.

However, the effective key size (security) is only increased to 56+64−1−lb(M) = 119 − lb(M) = ~119 bits, where M is the number of chosen plaintext/ciphertext pairs the adversary can obtain, and lb denotes the binary logarithm. Moreover, effective key size drops to 88 bits given 2^{32.5} known plaintext and using advanced slide attack.

DES-X also increases the strength of DES against differential cryptanalysis and linear cryptanalysis, although the improvement is much smaller than in the case of brute force attacks. It is estimated that differential cryptanalysis would require 2^{61} chosen plaintexts (vs. 2^{47} for DES), while linear cryptanalysis would require 2^{60} known plaintexts (vs. 2^{43} for DES or 2^{61} for DES with independent subkeys.) Note that with 2^{64} plaintexts (known or chosen being the same in this case), DES (or indeed any other block cipher with a 64 bit block size) is totally broken as the whole cipher's codebook becomes available.

Although the differential and linear attacks, currently best attack on DES-X is a known-plaintext slide attack discovered by Biryukov-Wagner which has complexity of 2^{32.5} known plaintexts and 2^{87.5} time of analysis. Moreover the attack is easily converted into a ciphertext-only attack with the same data complexity and 2^{95} offline time complexity.

== See also ==
- G-DES
- Meet-in-the-middle attack
- Triple DES
- Xor–encrypt–xor
