= SPDC =

SPDC has multiple meanings, including:

- Self-Protecting Digital Content
- Shell Petroleum Development Company of Nigeria
- State Peace and Development Council, the military regime of Myanmar (also known as Burma)
- Spontaneous parametric down-conversion, a process in quantum optics
- Social Policy and Development Centre, an economic policy research institution in Pakistan
- Steorn Private Developers Club
- Scholarship Programme for Diaspora Children, a scholarship given by the Indian Government to the People of Indian Origin and NRIs.
