= RSA Secret-Key Challenge =

Cryptography contest

The RSA Secret-Key Challenge was a series of cryptographic contests organised by RSA Laboratories with the intent of helping to demonstrate the relative security of different encryption algorithms. The challenge ran from 28 January 1997 until May 2007.

== Contest details ==
For each contest, RSA had posted on its website a block of ciphertext and the random initialization vector used for encryption. To win, a contestant would have had to break the code by finding the original plaintext and the cryptographic key that will generate the posted ciphertext from the plaintext. The challenge consisted of one DES contest and twelve contests based around the block cipher RC5.

Each of the RC5 contests is named after the variant of the RC5 cipher used. The name RC5-w/r/b indicates that the cipher used w-bit words, r rounds, and a key made up of b bytes. The contests are often referred to by the names of the corresponding distributed.net projects, for example RC5-32/12/9 is often known as RC5-72 due to the 72-bit key size.

The first contest was DES Challenge III (and was also part of the DES Challenges) and was completed in 22 hours 15 minutes by distributed.net and the EFF's Deep Crack machine.

In May 2007 RSA Laboratories announced the termination of the challenge, stating that they would not disclose the solutions to the remaining contents, and nor would they confirm or reward prize money for future solutions. On 8 September 2008 distributed.net announced that they would fund a prize of $4000 for the RC5-32/12/9 contest.

== Distributed.net ==
The contests are associated with the distributed.net group, which had actively participated in the challenge by making use of distributed computing to perform a brute force attack.

RC5-32/12/7 was completed on 19 October 1997, with distributed.net finding the winning key in 250 days and winning the US$10,000 prize. The recovered plaintext was: The unknown message is: It's time to move to a longer key length.

RC5-32/12/8 also carried a US$10,000 prize and was completed by distributed.net on 14 July 2002. It took the group 1,757 days to locate the key, revealing the plaintext: The unknown message is: Some things are better left unread.

There were eight contests that had not yet been solved, RC5/32/12/9 through RC5/32/12/16, each of which was a US$10,000 prize. Distributed.net is working on RC5-32/12/9 and were at 15.200% as of January 1 2026 (12.298% as of July 13 2024, 7.559% as of March 22 2021, 6.700% as of 20 June 2020, 5.329% as of 18 September 2018, 4.356% as of 7 January 2017).

== See also ==
- RSA Factoring Challenge
