= Paul Kocher =

Paul Kocher may refer to:

- Paul Carl Kocher, cryptographer
- Paul H. Kocher, professor of English and author
