= Perfect ruler =

A perfect ruler of length $\ell$ is a ruler with integer markings $a_1=0 < a_2 < \dots < a_n=\ell$, for which there exists an integer $m$ such that any positive integer $k\leq m$ is uniquely expressed as the difference $k=a_i-a_j$ for some $i,j$. This is referred to as an $m$-perfect ruler.

An optimal perfect ruler is one of the shortest length for fixed values of $m$ and $n$.

== Example ==
A 4-perfect ruler of length $7$ is given by $(a_1,a_2,a_3,a_4)=(0,1,3,7)$. To verify this, we need to show that every positive integer $k\leq 4$ is uniquely expressed as the difference of two markings:

$$1=1-0$$
$$2=3-1$$
$$3=3-0$$
$$4=7-3$$

== See also ==
- Golomb ruler
- Sparse ruler
- All-interval tetrachord
