= Brute Force: Cracking the Data Encryption Standard =

Book by Matt Curtin

Brute Force
- Author: Matt Curtin
- Language: English
- Genre: Factual
- Publisher: Copernicus Books
- Publication date: 2005
- ISBN: 0387271600

Brute Force: Cracking the Data Encryption Standard (2005, Copernicus Books ISBN 0387271600) is a book by Matt Curtin about cryptography.

In this book, Curtin recounts his involvement in the DESCHALL Project, mobilizing thousands of personal computers in 1997 in order to meet the challenge to crack a single message encrypted with DES.

This was and remains one of the largest collaborations of any kind on a single project in history.

The message was unencrypted on June 18 and was found to be "Strong cryptography makes the world a safer place."

This is also the message of Curtin's book where he uses a personal account to reveal to the uninitiated reader some insight into a topic of growing importance which is both technically and politically complicated.
