= Golomb ruler =

Set of marks along a ruler such that no two pairs of marks are the same distance apart

Golomb ruler of order 4 and length 6. This ruler is both optimal and perfect.

The perfect circular Golomb rulers (also called difference sets) with the specified order. (This preview should show multiple concentric circles. If not, click to view a larger version.)

In mathematics, a Golomb ruler is a set of marks at integer positions along a ruler such that no two pairs of marks are the same distance apart. The number of marks on the ruler is its order, and the largest distance between two of its marks is its length. Translation and reflection of a Golomb ruler are considered trivial, so the smallest mark is customarily put at 0 and the next mark at the smaller of its two possible values. Golomb rulers can be viewed as a one-dimensional special case of Costas arrays.

The Golomb ruler was named for Solomon W. Golomb and discovered independently by Sidon (1932) and Babcock (1953). Sophie Piccard also published early research on these sets, in 1939, stating as a theorem the claim that two Golomb rulers with the same distance set must be congruent. This turned out to be false for six-point rulers, but true otherwise.

There is no requirement that a Golomb ruler be able to measure all distances up to its length, but if it does, it is called a perfect Golomb ruler. It has been proved that no perfect Golomb ruler exists for five or more marks. A Golomb ruler is optimal if no shorter Golomb ruler of the same order exists. Creating Golomb rulers is easy, but proving the optimal Golomb ruler (or rulers) for a specified order is computationally very challenging.

Distributed.net has completed distributed massively parallel searches for optimal order-24 through order-28 Golomb rulers, each time confirming the suspected candidate ruler.

Currently, the complexity of finding optimal Golomb rulers (OGRs) of arbitrary order n (where n is given in unary) is unknown. In the past there was some speculation that it is an NP-hard problem. Problems related to the construction of Golomb rulers are provably shown to be NP-hard, where it is also noted that no known NP-complete problem has a similar flavor to finding Golomb rulers.

Golomb rulers have practical applications in information theory and error correction, radio frequency selection and antenna placement, as well as current transformers.

== Definitions ==
=== Golomb rulers as sets ===
A set of integers $A = \{a_1,a_2,...,a_m\}$ where $a_1 < a_2 < ... < a_m$ is a Golomb ruler if and only if

$\text{for all } i,j,k,l \in \left\{1,2,...,m\right\} \text{such that } i \neq j \text{ and } k \neq l,\ a_i - a_j = a_k - a_l \iff i=k \text{ and } j=l.$

The order of such a Golomb ruler is $m$ and its length is $a_m - a_1$. The canonical form has $a_1 = 0$ and, if $m>2$, $a_2 - a_1 < a_m - a_{m-1}$. Such a form can be achieved through translation and reflection.

=== Golomb rulers as functions ===
An injective function $f:\left\{1,2,...,m\right\} \to \left\{0,1,...,n\right\}$ with $f(1) = 0$ and $f(m) = n$ is a Golomb ruler if and only if

$\text{for all } i,j,k,l \in \left\{1,2,...,m\right\} \text{such that } i \neq j \text{ and } k \neq l, f(i)-f(j) = f(k)-f(l) \iff i=k \text{ and } j=l.$

The order of such a Golomb ruler is $m$ and its length is $n$. The canonical form has

$f(2)<f(m)-f(m-1)$ if $m>2$.

=== Optimality ===
A Golomb ruler of order m with length n may be optimal in either of two respects:

- It may be optimally dense, exhibiting maximal m for the specific value of n,
- It may be optimally short, exhibiting minimal n for the specific value of m.

The general term optimal Golomb ruler is used to refer to the second type of optimality.

== Mathematical formulation ==
An optimization-based approach to find an optimal Golomb ruler of order n can be formulated as the following mixed-integer nonlinear programming (MINLP) problem. Let x_{i} ∈ {0,1} be binary variables indicating the presence of a mark at position i, for i = 1, ..., L_{u}, where L_{u} is an upper bound on the length of the ruler. Let t be a continuous variable representing the total length of the ruler. The problem is formulated as:

$$\begin{aligned}
\min_{t \geq 0,\ x_i \in \{0,1\}} \quad & t \\
\text{s.t.} \quad & i \cdot x_i \leq t, \quad \text{for } i = 1, \ldots, L_u, \\
& \sum_{i=1}^{L_u} x_i = n - 1, \\
& x_j + \sum_{i=1}^{L_u - j} x_i x_{i+j} \leq 1, \quad \text{for } j = 1, \ldots, L_u - 1.
\end{aligned}$$

In this model, the variables $x_i$ define the ruler marks, and the constraint involving the bilinear terms $x_i x_{i+j}$ ensures that all pairwise distances are distinct. The objective is to minimize the largest marked position, which corresponds to the ruler's length.

== Practical applications ==
Example of a conference room with proportions of a [0, 2, 7, 8, 11] Golomb ruler, making it configurable to 10 different sizes.

=== Information theory and error correction ===
Golomb rulers are used within information theory related to error correcting codes.

=== Radio frequency selection ===
Golomb rulers are used in the selection of radio frequencies to reduce the effects of intermodulation interference with both terrestrial and extraterrestrial applications.

=== Radio antenna placement ===
Golomb rulers are used in the design of phased arrays of radio antennas. In radio astronomy one-dimensional synthesis arrays can have the antennas in a Golomb ruler configuration in order to obtain minimum redundancy of the Fourier component sampling.

=== Current transformers ===
Multi-ratio current transformers use Golomb rulers to place transformer tap points.

== Methods of construction ==
A number of construction methods produce asymptotically optimal Golomb rulers.

=== Erdős–Turán construction ===
The following construction, due to Paul Erdős and Pál Turán, produces a Golomb ruler for every odd prime p.

$$2pk+(k^2\,\bmod\,p),k\in[0,p-1]$$

== Known optimal Golomb rulers ==
The following table contains all known optimal Golomb rulers, excluding those with marks in the reverse order. The first four are perfect.

Order	Length	Marks	Proved^{[*]}	Proof discovered by
1	0	0	1952	Wallace Babcock
2	1	0 1	1952	Wallace Babcock
3	3	0 1 3	1952	Wallace Babcock
4	6	0 1 4 6	1952	Wallace Babcock
5	11	0 1 4 9 11; 0 2 7 8 11	c. 1967	John P. Robinson and Arthur J. Bernstein
6	17	0 1 4 10 12 17; 0 1 4 10 15 17; 0 1 8 11 13 17; 0 1 8 12 14 17	c. 1967	John P. Robinson and Arthur J. Bernstein
7	25	0 1 4 10 18 23 25; 0 1 7 11 20 23 25; 0 1 11 16 19 23 25; 0 2 3 10 16 21 25; 0 2 7 13 21 22 25	c. 1967	John P. Robinson and Arthur J. Bernstein
8	34	0 1 4 9 15 22 32 34	1972	William Mixon
9	44	0 1 5 12 25 27 35 41 44	1972	William Mixon
10	55	0 1 6 10 23 26 34 41 53 55	1972	William Mixon
11	72	0 1 4 13 28 33 47 54 64 70 72; 0 1 9 19 24 31 52 56 58 69 72	1972	William Mixon
12	85	0 2 6 24 29 40 43 55 68 75 76 85	1979	John P. Robinson
13	106	0 2 5 25 37 43 59 70 85 89 98 99 106	1981	John P. Robinson
14	127	0 4 6 20 35 52 59 77 78 86 89 99 122 127	1985	James B. Shearer
15	151	0 4 20 30 57 59 62 76 100 111 123 136 144 145 151	1985	James B. Shearer
16	177	0 1 4 11 26 32 56 68 76 115 117 134 150 163 168 177	1986	James B. Shearer
17	199	0 5 7 17 52 56 67 80 81 100 122 138 159 165 168 191 199	1993	W. Olin Sibert
18	216	0 2 10 22 53 56 82 83 89 98 130 148 153 167 188 192 205 216	1993	W. Olin Sibert
19	246	0 1 6 25 32 72 100 108 120 130 153 169 187 190 204 231 233 242 246	1994	Apostolos Dollas, William T. Rankin and David McCracken
20	283	0 1 8 11 68 77 94 116 121 156 158 179 194 208 212 228 240 253 259 283	1997?	Mark Garry, David Vanderschel et al. (web project)
21	333	0 2 24 56 77 82 83 95 129 144 179 186 195 255 265 285 293 296 310 329 333	8 May 1998	Mark Garry, David Vanderschel et al. (web project)
22	356	0 1 9 14 43 70 106 122 124 128 159 179 204 223 253 263 270 291 330 341 353 356	1999	Mark Garry, David Vanderschel et al. (web project)
23	372	0 3 7 17 61 66 91 99 114 159 171 199 200 226 235 246 277 316 329 348 350 366 372	1999	Mark Garry, David Vanderschel et al. (web project)
24	425	0 9 33 37 38 97 122 129 140 142 152 191 205 208 252 278 286 326 332 353 368 384 403 425	13 October 2004	distributed.net
25	480	0 12 29 39 72 91 146 157 160 161 166 191 207 214 258 290 316 354 372 394 396 431 459 467 480	25 October 2008	distributed.net
26	492	0 1 33 83 104 110 124 163 185 200 203 249 251 258 314 318 343 356 386 430 440 456 464 475 487 492	24 February 2009	distributed.net
27	553	0 3 15 41 66 95 97 106 142 152 220 221 225 242 295 330 338 354 382 388 402 415 486 504 523 546 553	19 February 2014	distributed.net
28	585	0 3 15 41 66 95 97 106 142 152 220 221 225 242 295 330 338 354 382 388 402 415 486 504 523 546 553 585	23 November 2022	distributed.net

^{^ *} The optimal ruler would have been known before this date; this date represents that date when it was discovered to be optimal (because all other rulers were proved to not be smaller). For example, the ruler that turned out to be optimal for order 26 was recorded on 10 October 2007, but it was not known to be optimal until all other possibilities were exhausted on 24 February 2009.

== See also ==
- Costas array
- Volunteer computing
  - BOINC
  - distributed.net
- Perfect ruler
- Sidon sequence
- Sparse ruler
