= Edna Grossman =

American mathematician

Edna Grossman (born Edna Kalka) is an American mathematician. She was born in Germany, grew up in Brooklyn, New York, and graduated with a B.S. in mathematics from Brooklyn College. She earned her M.S. in mathematics from New York University's Courant Institute of Mathematical Sciences, where she also received her Ph.D. in mathematics in 1972; her thesis, supervised by Wilhelm Magnus, concerned the symmetries of free groups. Grossman worked for IBM, where she was part of the team that designed and analyzed the Data Encryption Standard. She is known for her development, along with Bryant Tuckerman, of the first slide attack in cryptanalysis.
