= Sparse ruler =

Abstract ruler in which some of the distance marks may be missing

A sparse ruler is a ruler in which some of the distance marks may be missing. More abstractly, a sparse ruler of length $L$ with $m$ marks is a sequence of integers $a_1, a_2, ..., a_m$ where $0 = a_1 < a_2 < ... < a_m = L$. The marks $a_1$ and $a_m$ correspond to the ends of the ruler. In order to measure the distance $K$, with $0\le K\le L$ there must be marks $a_i$ and $a_j$ such that $a_j-a_i=K$.

A complete sparse ruler allows one to measure any integer distance up to its full length. A complete sparse ruler is called minimal if there is no complete sparse ruler of length $L$ with $m-1$ marks. In other words, if any of the marks is removed one can no longer measure all of the distances, even if the marks could be rearranged. A complete sparse ruler is called maximal if there is no complete sparse ruler of greater length with $m$ marks. Complete minimal rulers of length 135 and 136 require one more mark than those of lengths 124-134, 137 and 138. A sparse ruler is called optimal if it is both minimal and maximal.

Since the number of distinct pairs of marks is $m(m-1)/2$, this is an upper bound on the length $L$ of any maximal sparse ruler with $m$ marks. This upper bound can be achieved only for 2, 3 or 4 marks. For larger numbers of marks, the difference between the optimal length and the bound grows gradually, and unevenly.

For example, for 6 marks the upper bound is 15, but the maximal length is 13. There are 3 different configurations of sparse rulers of length 13 with 6 marks. One is {0, 1, 2, 6, 10, 13}. To measure a length of 7, say, with this ruler one would take the distance between the marks at 6 and 13.

A Golomb ruler is a sparse ruler that requires all of the differences $a_j-a_i$ be distinct. In general, a Golomb ruler with $m$ marks will be considerably longer than an optimal sparse ruler with $m$ marks, since $m(m-1)/2$ is a lower bound for the length of a Golomb ruler. A long Golomb ruler will have gaps, that is, it will have distances which it cannot measure. For example, the optimal Golomb ruler {0, 1, 4, 10, 12, 17} has length 17, but cannot measure lengths of 14 or 15.

== Wichmann rulers ==
A sequence of complete sparse rulers was discovered by Wichmann. Wichmann's rulers have the form $W(r,s) = 1^r, r+1, (2r+1)^r, (4r+3)^s, (2r+2)^{(r+1)}, 1^r,$ where $a^b$ represents $b$ segments of length $a$. Thus, if $r = 1$ and $s = 2$, then $W(1,2)$ has (in order):
1 segment of length 1,
1 segment of length 2,
1 segment of length 3,
2 segments of length 7,
2 segments of length 4,
1 segment of length 1.

A minor variant is $w(r,s) = 1^r, r+1, (2r+1)^{(r+1)}, (4r+3)^s, (2r+2)^r, 1^r,$, with a length one less than $W(r,s)$.

$W(1,2)$ gives the ruler {0, 1, 3, 6, 13, 20, 24, 28, 29}, while $w(1,2)$ gives {0, 1, 3, 6, 9, 16, 23, 27, 28}. The length of a Wichmann ruler is $4r(r+s+2)+3(s+1)$ and the number of marks is $4r+s+3$. Many (but not all) Wichmann rulers are optimal, and Wichmann speculated that all sufficiently large optimal rulers are of this type. None of the optimal rulers of length 1, 13, 17, 23 and 58 follow this pattern, but no further non-Wichmann optimal rulers are known and there are known to be no others up to length 213.

== Asymptotics ==
For every $n$ let $l(n)$ be the smallest number of marks for a ruler of length $n$. For example, $l(6)=4$. The asymptotic of the function $l(n)$ was studied by Erdos, Gal (1948) and continued by Leech (1956) and Wichmann (1963), who proved that the limit $\lim_{n\to\infty}{l(n)^2}/n$ exists and is lower and upper bounded by
$\max_{0<\theta<2\pi}2(1-\tfrac{\sin(\theta)}{\theta}) = 2.434...\le \lim_{n\to\infty}\frac{l(n)^2}n = \inf_{n\in\mathbb N} \frac{(l(n)+2)^2}{n + 1} \le3.$

Better upper bounds exist for $n$-perfect rulers. Those are subsets $A$ of $\mathbb N$ such that each positive number $k\le n$ can be written as a difference $k=a-b$ for some $a,b\in A$. For every number $n$ let $k(n)$ be the smallest cardinality of an $n$-perfect ruler. It is clear that $k(n)\le l(n)$. The asymptotics of the sequence $k(n)$ was studied by Redei, Renyi (1949) and then by Leech (1956) and Golay (1972). Due to their efforts the following stronger upper bound was obtained:
$\lim_{n\to\infty}\frac{k(n)^2}n=\inf_{n\in\mathbb N}\frac{k(n)^2}n\le\frac{128^2}{6166}=2.6571...<\frac83.$

== Examples ==
The following are examples of minimal sparse rulers. Optimal rulers are highlighted. When there are too many to list, not all are included. Mirror images are not shown.

Length	Marks	Number	Examples	List Form	Wichmann
1	2	1	II	{0, 1}	
2	3	1	III	{0, 1, 2}	
3	3	1	II.I	{0, 1, 3}	W(0,0)
4	4	2	III.I; II.II	{0, 1, 2, 4} {0, 1, 3, 4}	
5	4	2	III..I; II.I.I	{0, 1, 2, 5} {0, 1, 3, 5}	
6	4	1	II..I.I	{0, 1, 4, 6}	W(0,1)
7	5	6	IIII...I; III.I..I; III..I.I; II.I.I.I; II.I..II; II..II.I	{0, 1, 2, 3, 7} {0, 1, 2, 4, 7} {0, 1, 2, 5, 7} {0, 1, 3, 5, 7} {0, 1, 3, 6, 7} {0, 1, 4, 5, 7}	
8	5	4	III..I..I; II.I...II; II..I.I.I; II...II.I	{0, 1, 2, 5, 8} {0, 1, 3, 7, 8} {0, 1, 4, 6, 8} {0, 1, 5, 6, 8}	
9	5	2	III...I..I; II..I..I.I	{0, 1, 2, 6, 9} {0, 1, 4, 7, 9}	- W(0,2)
10	6	19	IIII..I...I	{0, 1, 2, 3, 6, 10}	
11	6	15	IIII...I...I	{0, 1, 2, 3, 7, 11}	
12	6	7	IIII....I...I; III...I..I..I; II.I.I.....II; II.I...I...II; II..II....I.I; II..I..I..I.I; II.....II.I.I	{0, 1, 2, 3, 8, 12} {0, 1, 2, 6, 9, 12} {0, 1, 3, 5, 11, 12} {0, 1, 3, 7, 11, 12} {0, 1, 4, 5, 10, 12} {0, 1, 4, 7, 10, 12} {0, 1, 7, 8, 10, 12}	- - - - - W(0,3) -
13	6	3	III...I...I..I; II..II.....I.I; II....I..I.I.I	{0, 1, 2, 6, 10, 13} {0, 1, 4, 5, 11, 13} {0, 1, 6, 9, 11, 13}	
14	7	65	IIIII....I....I	{0, 1, 2, 3, 4, 9, 14}	
15	7	40	II.I..I...I...II; II..I..I..I..I.I	{0, 1, 3, 6, 10, 14, 15} {0, 1, 4, 7, 10, 13, 15}	W(1,0); W(0,4)
16	7	16	IIII....I...I...I	{0, 1, 2, 3, 8, 12, 16}	
17	7	6	IIII....I....I...I; III...I...I...I..I; III.....I...I.I..I; III.....I...I..I.I; II..I.....I.I..I.I; II......I..I.I.I.I	{0, 1, 2, 3, 8, 13, 17} {0, 1, 2, 6, 10, 14, 17} {0, 1, 2, 8, 12, 14, 17} {0, 1, 2, 8, 12, 15, 17} {0, 1, 4, 10, 12, 15, 17} {0, 1, 8, 11, 13, 15, 17}	
18	8	250	II..I..I..I..I..I.I	{0, 1, 4, 7, 10, 13, 16, 18}	W(0,5)
19	8	163	IIIII....I....I....I	{0, 1, 2, 3, 4, 9, 14, 19}	
20	8	75	IIIII.....I....I....I	{0, 1, 2, 3, 4, 10, 15, 20}	
21	8	33	IIIII.....I.....I....I	{0, 1, 2, 3, 4, 10, 16, 21}	
22	8	9	IIII....I....I....I...I; III.......I....I..I..II; II.I.I........II.....II; II.I..I......I...I...II; II.I.....I.....I...II.I; II..II......I.I.....I.I; II....II..I.......I.I.I; II....I..I......I.I.I.I; II.....II........II.I.I	{0, 1, 2, 3, 8, 13, 18, 22} {0, 1, 2, 10, 15, 18, 21, 22} {0, 1, 3, 5, 14, 15, 21, 22} {0, 1, 3, 6, 13, 17, 21, 22} {0, 1, 3, 9, 15, 19, 20, 22} {0, 1, 4, 5, 12, 14, 20, 22} {0, 1, 6, 7, 10, 18, 20, 22} {0, 1, 6, 9, 16, 18, 20, 22} {0, 1, 7, 8, 17, 18, 20, 22}	- - - W(1,1) - - - - -
23	8	2	III........I...I..I..I.I; II..I.....I.....I.I..I.I	{0, 1, 2, 11, 15, 18, 21, 23} {0, 1, 4, 10, 16, 18, 21, 23}	
24	9	472	IIIIII......I.....I.....I	{0, 1, 2, 3, 4, 5, 12, 18, 24}	
25	9	230	IIIIII......I......I.....I	{0, 1, 2, 3, 4, 5, 12, 19, 25}	
26	9	83	IIIII.....I....I.....I....I	{0, 1, 2, 3, 4, 10, 15, 21, 26}	
27	9	28	IIIII.....I.....I.....I....I	{0, 1, 2, 3, 4, 10, 16, 22, 27}	
28	9	6	III..........I....I..I..I..II; II.I.I.I..........II.......II; II.I..I..I......I......I...II; II.I.....I.....I.....I...II.I; II.....I...I........I..I.II.I; II.......II..........II.I.I.I	{0, 1, 2, 13, 18, 21, 24, 27, 28} {0, 1, 3, 5, 7, 18, 19, 27, 28} {0, 1, 3, 6, 9, 16, 23, 27, 28} {0, 1, 3, 9, 15, 21, 25, 26, 28} {0, 1, 7, 11, 20, 23, 25, 26, 28} {0, 1, 9, 10, 21, 22, 24, 26, 28}	
29	9	3	III...........I...I..I..I..I.I; II.I..I......I......I...I...II; II..I.....I.....I.....I.I..I.I	{0, 1, 2, 14, 18, 21, 24, 27, 29} {0, 1, 3, 6, 13, 20, 24, 28, 29} {0, 1, 4, 10, 16, 22, 24, 27, 29}	- W(1,2) -
35	10	5	III..............I...I..I..I..I..I.I; II.I..I..I......I......I......I...II; II.I..I..I.........I...I......I...II; II..II..........I.I......I.I.....I.I; II..I.....I.....I.....I.....I.I..I.I	{0, 1, 2, 17, 21, 24, 27, 30, 33, 35} {0, 1, 3, 6, 9, 16, 23, 30, 34, 35} {0, 1, 3, 6, 9, 19, 23, 30, 34, 35} {0, 1, 4, 5, 16, 18, 25, 27, 33, 35} {0, 1, 4, 10, 16, 22, 28, 30, 33, 35}	
36	10	1	II.I..I......I......I......I...I...II	{0, 1, 3, 6, 13, 20, 27, 31, 35, 36}	W(1,3)
43	11	1	II.I..I......I......I......I......I...I...II	{0, 1, 3, 6, 13, 20, 27, 34, 38, 42, 43}	W(1,4)
46	12	342	III..I....I....I..........I.....I.....I.....III	{0, 1, 2, 5, 10, 15, 26, 32, 38, 44, 45, 46}	W(2,1)
50	12	2	IIII...................I....I...I...I...I...I..I..I; II.I..I......I......I......I......I......I...I...II	{0, 1, 2, 3, 23, 28, 32, 36, 40, 44, 47, 50} {0, 1, 3, 6, 13, 20, 27, 34, 41, 45, 49, 50}	- W(1,5)
57	13	12	III..I....I....I..........I..........I.....I.....I.....III; II.I..I......I......I......I......I......I......I...I...II	{0, 1, 2, 5, 10, 15, 26, 37, 43, 49, 55, 56, 57} {0, 1, 3, 6, 13, 20, 27, 34, 41, 48, 52, 56, 57}	W(2,2); W(1,6)
58	13	6	IIII.......................I....I...I...I...I...I...I..I..I; III...I.I........I........I........I........I..I......I..II; III.....I......II.........I.........I.........I..I...I.I..I; II.I..I..........I..I......I.......I.........I...I...I...II; II.I..I..........I......I..I..........I......I...I...I...II; II...I..I...I........I........I........I........I....II.I.I	{0, 1, 2, 3, 27, 32, 36, 40, 44, 48, 52, 55, 58} {0, 1, 2, 6, 8, 17, 26, 35, 44, 47, 54, 57, 58} {0, 1, 2, 8, 15, 16, 26, 36, 46, 49, 53, 55, 58} {0, 1, 3, 6, 17, 20, 27, 35, 45, 49, 53, 57, 58} {0, 1, 3, 6, 17, 24, 27, 38, 45, 49, 53, 57, 58} {0, 1, 5, 8, 12, 21, 30, 39, 48, 53, 54, 56, 58}	
68	14	2	III..I....I....I..........I..........I..........I.....I.....I.....III; III.....I......II.........I.........I.........I.........I..I...I.I..I	{0, 1, 2, 5, 10, 15, 26, 37, 48, 54, 60, 66, 67, 68} {0, 1, 2, 8, 15, 16, 26, 36, 46, 56, 59, 63, 65, 68}	W(2,3) -
79	15	1	III..I....I....I..........I..........I..........I..........I.....I.....I.....III	{0, 1, 2, 5, 10, 15, 26, 37, 48, 59, 65, 71, 77, 78, 79}	W(2,4)
90	16	1	III..I....I....I..........I..........I..........I..........I..........I.....I.....I.....III	{0, 1, 2, 5, 10, 15, 26, 37, 48, 59, 70, 76, 82, 88, 89, 90}	W(2,5)
101	17	1	III..I....I....I..........I..........I..........I..........I..........I..........I.....I.....I.....III	{0,1,2,5,10,15,26,37,48,59,70,81,87,93,99,100,101}	W(2,6)
112	18	1	III..I....I....I..........I..........I..........I..........I..........I..........I..........I.....I.....I.....III	{0,1,2,5,10,15,26,37,48,59,70,81,92,98,104,110,111,112}	W(2,7)
123	19	2	IIII...I......I......I......I..............I..............I..............I..............I.......I.......I.......I.......IIII III..I....I....I..........I..........I..........I..........I..........I..........I..........I..........I.....I.....I.....III	{0,1,2,3,7,14,21,28,43,58,73,88,96,104,112,120,121,122,123} {0,1,2,5,10,15,26,37,48,59,70,81,92,103,109,115,121,122,123}	W(3,4); W(2,8)
138	20	1	IIII...I......I......I......I..............I..............I..............I..............I..............I.......I.......I.......I.......IIII	{0,1,2,3,7,14,21,28,43,58,73,88,103,111,119,127,135,136,137,138}	W(3,5)

== Incomplete sparse rulers ==
A few incomplete rulers can fully measure up to a longer distance than an optimal sparse ruler with the same number of marks. $\{0, 2, 7, 14, 15, 18, 24\}$, $\{0, 2, 7, 13, 16, 17, 25\}$, $\{0, 5, 7, 13, 16, 17, 31\}$, and $\{0, 6, 10, 15, 17, 18, 31\}$ can each measure up to 18, while an optimal sparse ruler with 7 marks can measure only up to 17. The table below lists these rulers, up to rulers with 13 marks. Mirror images are not shown. Rulers that can fully measure up to a longer distance than any shorter ruler with the same number of marks are highlighted.

Marks	Length	Measures up to	Ruler
7	24	18	{0, 2, 7, 14, 15, 18, 24}
7	25	18	{0, 2, 7, 13, 16, 17, 25}
7	31	18	{0, 5, 7, 13, 16, 17, 31}
7	31	18	{0, 6, 10, 15, 17, 18, 31}
8	39	24	{0, 8, 15, 17, 20, 21, 31, 39}
10	64	37	{0, 7, 22, 27, 28, 31, 39, 41, 57, 64}
10	73	37	{0, 16, 17, 28, 36, 42, 46, 49, 51, 73}
11	68	44	{0, 7, 10, 27, 29, 38, 42, 43, 44, 50, 68}
11	91	45	{0, 18, 19, 22, 31, 42, 48, 56, 58, 63, 91}
12	53	51	{0, 2, 3, 6, 9, 17, 25, 33, 41, 46, 51, 53}
12	60	51	{0, 5, 9, 13, 19, 26, 33, 48, 49, 50, 51, 60}
12	73	51	{0, 2, 3, 10, 17, 23, 35, 42, 46, 47, 51, 73}
12	75	51	{0, 2, 10, 13, 29, 33, 36, 45, 50, 51, 57, 75}
12	82	51	{0, 8, 28, 31, 34, 38, 45, 47, 49, 50, 74, 82}
12	83	51	{0, 2, 10, 24, 25, 29, 36, 42, 45, 73, 75, 83}
12	85	51	{0, 8, 10, 19, 35, 41, 42, 47, 55, 56, 59, 85}
12	87	51	{0, 12, 24, 26, 37, 39, 42, 43, 46, 47, 75, 87}
13	61	59	{0, 2, 3, 6, 9, 17, 25, 33, 41, 49, 54, 59, 61}
13	69	59	{0, 6, 10, 15, 22, 30, 38, 55, 56, 57, 58, 59, 69}
13	69	59	{0, 6, 11, 15, 22, 30, 38, 55, 56, 57, 58, 59, 69}
13	82	59	{0, 4, 5, 9, 25, 27, 39, 42, 50, 53, 56, 63, 82}
13	83	59	{0, 1, 2, 24, 34, 36, 38, 43, 51, 54, 57, 82, 83}
13	88	59	{0, 1, 3, 9, 16, 26, 36, 40, 47, 54, 58, 59, 88}
13	88	59	{0, 1, 5, 29, 34, 36, 47, 48, 50, 56, 58, 73, 88}
13	90	59	{0, 7, 12, 16, 37, 38, 43, 55, 56, 57, 58, 66, 90}
13	91	59	{0, 5, 9, 12, 16, 32, 38, 42, 55, 56, 57, 63, 91}
13	92	59	{0, 6, 10, 13, 25, 34, 39, 54, 55, 56, 57, 65, 92}
13	94	59	{0, 1, 3, 16, 28, 37, 45, 48, 54, 55, 59, 78, 94}
13	95	59	{0, 4, 32, 37, 38, 40, 48, 53, 54, 56, 63, 83, 95}
13	96	59	{0, 3, 7, 27, 37, 39, 50, 55, 56, 58, 72, 81, 96}
13	101	59	{0, 4, 24, 37, 43, 45, 52, 54, 55, 59, 77, 81, 101}
13	108	59	{0, 8, 17, 40, 50, 53, 64, 65, 69, 71, 91, 99, 108}
13	113	61	{0, 6, 22, 36, 45, 47, 57, 60, 64, 65, 91, 97, 113}
13	133	60	{0, 26, 29, 40, 42, 46, 67, 74, 79, 89, 97, 98, 133}

== See also ==
- Gauge block
- Golomb ruler
- Perfect ruler
