= Matt Curtin =

American computer scientist

Matt Curtin (born 1973) is a computer scientist and entrepreneur in Columbus, Ohio best known for his work in cryptography and firewall systems. He is the founder of Interhack Corporation, first faculty advisor of Open Source Club at The Ohio State University, and lecturer in the Department of Computer Science and Engineering at The Ohio State University, where he teaches a Common Lisp course. The author of two books, Developing Trust: Online Privacy and Security and Brute Force: Cracking the Data Encryption Standard.

Curtin's work includes helping to prove the weakness of the Data Encryption Standard and providing expert testimony in Blumofe v. Pharmatrak, in which a key ruling was made by the U.S. Court of Appeals for the First Circuit, showing how the Electronic Communications Privacy Act (ECPA) applies to Web technology.
