= GDES =

Block cipher

General
- Designers: Ingrid Schaumuller-Bichl
- First published: 1981
- Derived from: DES

Cipher detail
- Block sizes: variable, multiple of 32
- Structure: generalized Feistel network
- Rounds: variable, even

Best public cryptanalysis
- differential cryptanalysis breaks most variants more easily than DES

In cryptography, the Generalized DES Scheme (GDES or G-DES) is a variant of the DES symmetric-key block cipher designed with the intention of speeding up the encryption process while improving its security. The scheme was proposed by Ingrid Schaumuller-Bichl in 1981.

In 1990, Eli Biham and Adi Shamir showed that GDES was vulnerable to differential cryptanalysis, and that any GDES variant faster than DES is also less secure than DES.

GDES generalizes the Feistel network structure of DES to larger block sizes. In each round, the DES round function is applied to the rightmost 32-bit subblock, and the result is XORed with all the other parts. Then the block is rotated 32 bits to the right.
