= Distributed.net =

Distributed computing organization

distributed.net
- Website type: Volunteer computing
- Owners: Distributed Computing Technologies, Inc.
- Website: distributed.net
- Launched: February 1997
- Current status: Active

Distributed.net is a volunteer computing effort that is attempting to solve large scale problems using otherwise idle CPU or GPU time. It is governed by Distributed Computing Technologies, Incorporated (DCTI), a non-profit organization under U.S. tax code 501(c)(3).

Distributed.net is working on RC5-72 (breaking RC5 with a 72-bit key). The RC5-72 project is on pace to exhaust the keyspace in just under 36 years as of July 2025, although the project will end whenever the required key is found. RC5 has eight unsolved challenges from RSA Security, although in May 2007, RSA Security announced that they would no longer be providing prize money for a correct key to any of their secret key challenges. distributed.net has decided to sponsor the original prize offer for finding the key as a result.

In 2001, distributed.net was estimated to have a throughput of over 30 TFLOPS. As of August 2019, the throughput was estimated to be the same as a Cray XC40, as used in the Lonestar 5 supercomputer, or around 1.25 petaFLOPs.

== History ==
A coordinated effort was started in February 1997 by Earle Ady and Christopher G. Stach II of Hotjobs.com and New Media Labs, as an effort to break the RC5-56 portion of the RSA Secret-Key Challenge, a 56-bit encryption algorithm that had a $10,000 USD prize available to anyone who could find the key. Unfortunately, this initial effort had to be suspended as the result of SYN flood attacks by participants upon the server.

A new independent effort, named distributed.net, was coordinated by Jeffrey A. Lawson, Adam L. Beberg, and David C. McNett along with several others who would serve on the board and operate infrastructure. By late March 1997 new proxies were released to resume RC5-56 and work began on enhanced clients. A cow head was selected as the icon of the application and the project's mascot.

The RC5-56 challenge was solved on October 19, 1997, after 250 days. The correct key was "0x532B744CC20999" and the plaintext message read "The unknown message is: It's time to move to a longer key length".

The RC5-64 challenge was solved on July 14, 2002, after 1,757 days. The correct key was "0x63DE7DC154F4D039" and the plaintext message read "The unknown message is: Some things are better left unread".

The search for Optimal Golomb Rulers (OGRs) of order 24, 25, 26, 27 and 28 were completed by distributed.net on 13 October 2004, 25 October 2008, 24 February 2009, 19 February 2014, and 23 November 2022 respectively.

== Client ==
"DNETC" is the file name of the software application which users run to participate in any active distributed.net project. It is a command line program with an interface to configure it, available for a wide variety of platforms. distributed.net refers to the software application simply as the "client". As of April 2019, volunteers running 32-bit Windows with AMD FireStream enabled GPUs have contributed the most processing power to the RC5-72 project and volunteers running 64-bit Linux have contributed the most processing power to the OGR-28 project.

Portions of the source code for the client are publicly available, although users are not permitted to distribute modified versions themselves.

Distributed.net's RC5-72 project is available on the BOINC client through the Moo! Wrapper.

== Development of GPU-enabled clients ==
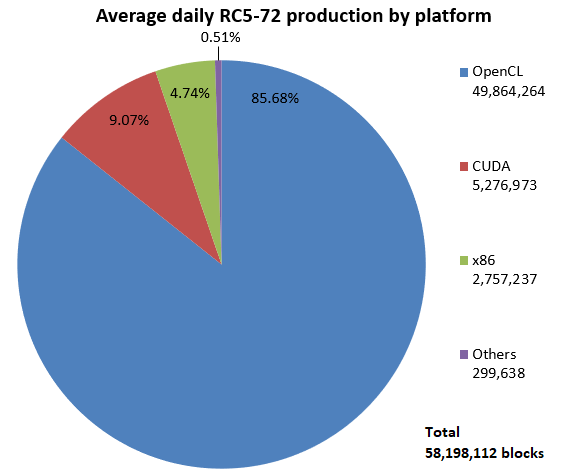
Average daily RC5-72 production by platform for 26 May 2024 – 4 January 2025

In recent years, most of the work on the RC5-72 project has been submitted by clients that run on the GPU of modern graphics cards. Although the project had already been underway for almost 6 years when the first GPUs began submitting results, as of July 2025, GPUs represent almost 89% of all completed work units, and complete more than 95% of all work units each day.

- NVIDIA

In late 2007, work began on the implementation of new RC5-72 cores designed to run on NVIDIA CUDA-enabled hardware, with the first completed work units reported in November 2008. On high-end NVIDIA video cards at the time, upwards of 600 million keys/second was observed For comparison, a 2008-era high-end single CPU working on RC5-72 achieved about 50 million keys/second, representing a very significant advancement for RC5-72. As of July 2025, CUDA clients have completed almost 11% of all work on the RC5-72 project, and perform almost 9% of the work each day.

- AMD / ATI

Similarly, near the end of 2008, work began on the implementation of new RC5-72 cores designed to run on AMD FireStream-enabled hardware. Some of the products in the Radeon HD 5000 and 6000 series provided key rates in excess of 1.8 billion keys/second. As of January 2025, FireStream clients have completed over 19% of all work on the RC5-72 project. Daily production from FireStream clients has dropped below 0.5% as the majority of AMD GPU contributors now use the OpenCL client.

- OpenCL

An OpenCL client entered beta testing in late 2012 and was released in 2013. As of January 2025, OpenCL clients have completed more than 58% of all work on the RC5-72 project, and now perform 86% of the work each day. No breakdown of OpenCL production by GPU manufacturer exists, as AMD, NVIDIA, and Intel GPUs all support OpenCL.

== Timeline of distributed.net projects ==
Timeline of projects hosted by distributed.net, as of March 2026

Current

- RSA Lab's 72-bit RC5 Encryption Challenge started 3 December 2002 — In progress, 15.691% complete as of 18 March 2026 (although RSA Labs has discontinued sponsorship)

Cryptography

- RSA Lab's 56-bit RC5 Encryption Challenge — Completed 19 October 1997 (after 250 days and 47% of the key space tested).
- RSA Lab's 56-bit DES-II-1 Encryption Challenge — Completed 23 February 1998 (after 39 days)
- RSA Lab's 56-bit DES-II-2 Encryption Challenge — Ended 15 July 1998 (found independently by the EFF DES cracker after 2.5 days)
- RSA Lab's 56-bit DES-III Encryption Challenge — Completed 19 January 1999 (after 22.5 hours with the help of the EFF DES cracker)
- CS-Cipher Challenge — Completed 16 January 2000 (after 60 days and 98% of the key space tested).
- RSA Lab's 64-bit RC5 Encryption Challenge — Completed 14 July 2002 (after 1726 days and 83% of the key space tested).

Golomb rulers

- Optimal Golomb Rulers (OGR-24) — Completed 13 October 2004 (after 1552 days, confirmed predicted best ruler)
- Optimal Golomb Rulers (OGR-25) — Completed 24 October 2008 (after 3006 days, confirmed predicted best ruler)
- Optimal Golomb Rulers (OGR-26) — Completed 24 February 2009 (after 121 days, confirmed predicted best ruler)
- Optimal Golomb Rulers (OGR-27) — Completed 19 February 2014 (after 1822 days, confirmed predicted best ruler)
- Optimal Golomb Rulers (OGR-28) — Completed 23 November 2022 (after 3199 days, confirmed predicted best ruler)

== See also ==
- RSA Secret-Key Challenge
- Golomb Ruler
- DES Challenges
- Brute force attack
- Cryptanalysis
- Key size
- List of volunteer computing projects
- Berkeley Open Infrastructure for Network Computing
