= Cryptography Research =

San Francisco based cryptography company

Cryptography Research, Inc.
- Type: Private subsidiary
- Founded: 1995; 31 years ago
- Headquarters: San Francisco, California
- Key people: Paul Kocher, President and Chief Scientist
- Products: Technology licensing, secure semiconductors
- Revenue: $10M–$100M
- Number of employees: 25–100
- Parent: Rambus
- Website: rambus.com/security

Cryptography Research, Inc. was a San Francisco based cryptography company specializing in applied cryptographic engineering, including technologies for building tamper-resistant semiconductors. It was purchased on June 6, 2011, by Rambus for $342.5M and remained active as a subsidiary until 2015. The company licensed patents for protecting cryptographic devices against power analysis attacks. The company's CryptoFirewall-brand ASIC cores were used in pay TV conditional access systems and anti-counterfeiting applications. CRI also developed BD+, a security component in the Blu-ray disc format, and played a role in the format war between HD DVD and Blu-ray. The company's services group assisted with security testing, disaster recovery, and training.

Cryptography Research protected its core operations from outside attack by maintaining a secured local network that is not connected to the Internet at all. Employees who needed to work with sensitive data had two computers on their desks — one to access the secure network, and a separate computer to access the Internet.
