= Bryant Tuckerman =

American mathematician (1915–2002)

- Born: November 28, 1915; Lincoln, Nebraska, U.S.
- Died: May 19, 2002 (aged 86); Briarcliff Manor, New York, U.S.
- Education: Princeton University; Antioch College
- Scientific career
- Fields: Mathematics
- Workplaces: Cornell University; Oberlin College

Louis Bryant Tuckerman III (November 28, 1915 – May 19, 2002) was an American mathematician. He was a member of the team that developed the Data Encryption Standard (DES).

He studied topology at Princeton, where he invented the Tuckerman traverse method for revealing all the faces of a flexagon.

On March 4, 1971, he discovered the 24th Mersenne prime, a titanic prime, with a value of

$$2^{19937}-1$$.
