= Yahalom (protocol) =

Yahalom is an authentication and secure key-sharing protocol designed for use on an insecure network such as the Internet. Yahalom uses a trusted arbitrator to distribute a shared key between two people. This protocol can be considered as an improved version of Wide Mouth Frog protocol (with additional protection against man-in-the-middle attack), but less secure than the Needham–Schroeder protocol.

== Protocol description ==
If Alice (A) initiates the communication to Bob (B) with S is a server trusted by both parties, the protocol can be specified as follows using security protocol notation:

- A and B are identities of Alice and Bob respectively
- $K_{AS}$ is a symmetric key known only to A and S
- $K_{BS}$ is a symmetric key known only to B and S
- $N_A$ and $N_B$ are nonces generated by A and B respectively
- $K_{AB}$ is a symmetric, generated key, which will be the session key of the session between A and B

$A \rightarrow B: A, N_A$

Alice sends a message to Bob requesting communication.

$B \rightarrow S: B,\{A, N_A, N_B\}_{K_{BS}}$

Bob sends a message to the Server encrypted under $K_{BS}$.

$S \rightarrow A: \{B, K_{AB}, N_A, N_B\}_{K_{AS}}, \{A, K_{AB}\}_{K_{BS}}$

The Server sends to Alice a message containing the generated session key $K_{AB}$ and a message to be forwarded to Bob.

$A \rightarrow B: \{A, K_{AB}\}_{K_{BS}}, \{N_B\}_{K_{AB}}$

Alice forwards the message to Bob and verifies $N_A$ has not changed. Bob will verify $N_B$ has not changed when he receives the message.

== BAN-Yahalom ==
Burrows􏰂, Abadi􏰂 and Needham proposed a variant of this protocol in their 1989 paper as follows:

$A \rightarrow B: A, N_A$
$B \rightarrow S: B, N_B, \{A, N_A\}_{K_{BS}}$
$S \rightarrow A: N_B, \{B, K_{AB}, N_A\}_{K_{AS}}, \{A, K_{AB}, N_B\}_{K_{BS}}$
$A \rightarrow B: \{A, K_{AB}, N_B\}_{K_{BS}}, \{N_B\}_{K_{AB}}$

In 1994, Paul Syverson demonstrated two attacks on this protocol.

== See also ==
- Kerberos protocol
- Otway–Rees protocol
- Neuman–Stubblebine protocol
