= MacOS Sierra =

2016 operating system version

macOS Sierra
- Version of the macOS operating system

- Screenshot of macOS Sierra desktop
- Developer: Apple
- OS family: Macintosh; Unix
- Working state: No longer supported
- Source model: Closed, with open-source components
- General availability: September 20, 2016; 10 years ago
- Latest release: 10.12.6 (16G2136) / September 26, 2019; 7 years ago
- Update method: Mac App Store
- Supported platforms: x86-64
- Kernel type: Hybrid (XNU)
- License: APSL and Apple EULA
- Preceded by: OS X El Capitan
- Succeeded by: macOS High Sierra
- Official website: MacOS Sierra (archived at Wayback Machine)
- Tagline: What can your Mac do now? Just ask.

Support status
- Obsolete, unsupported as of September 2019. iTunes is no longer being updated, but is able to download driver updates to sync to newer devices.

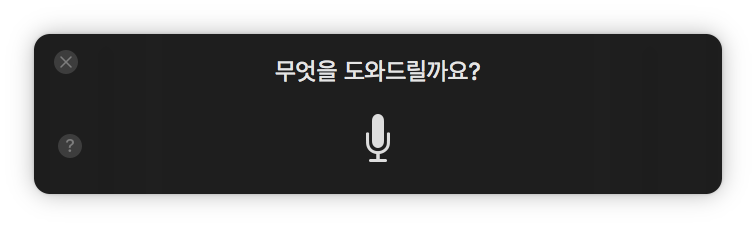
Siri interface in macOS Sierra, localized in Korean

macOS Sierra (version 10.12) is the thirteenth major release of macOS (formerly known as OS X and Mac OS X), Apple's desktop and server operating system for Macintosh computers. The name "macOS" stems from the intention to unify the operating system's name with that of iOS, watchOS and tvOS. Sierra is named after the Sierra Nevada mountain range in California and Nevada. Specifically, Lone Pine Peak is the location for macOS Sierra's default wallpaper. Its major new features concern Continuity, iCloud, and windowing, as well as support for Apple Pay and Siri.

The first beta of macOS Sierra was released to developers shortly following the 2016 WWDC keynote on June 13, 2016. The first public-beta release followed on July 7, 2016. It was released to end users on September 20, 2016, as a free upgrade through the Mac App Store and it was succeeded by macOS High Sierra on September 25, 2017.

== System requirements ==
macOS Sierra requires at least 2 GB of RAM and 8 GB of storage space and is designed to run on the following products:

- iMac (Late 2009 or later)
- MacBook (Late 2009 or later)
- MacBook Air (Late 2010 or later)
- MacBook Pro (Mid 2010 or later)
- Mac Mini (Mid 2010 or later)
- Mac Pro (Mid 2010 or later)

Sierra dropped support for various Macs released from mid 2007 to mid 2009, the first version of macOS since OS X Mountain Lion, released in 2012, to do so. Support for Xserve was also dropped in Sierra.

=== Workarounds for unsupported systems ===
Developers have created workarounds to install macOS Sierra on some Mac computers that are no longer officially supported as long as they are packed with a CPU that supports SSE4.1. This requires using a patch to modify the install image.

== Changes ==
=== Default wallpaper ===
The default desktop picture is an image of Lone Pine Peak.

=== System features ===
==== Siri ====
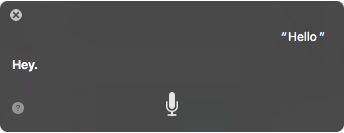
A demonstration of Siri on macOS Sierra Beta

The user can access the Siri intelligent assistant via the Dock, the menu bar or a keyboard shortcut and results are shown in a window in the upper-right corner. Siri can send messages, search the web, find files and adjust settings. Results can be dropped into other applications or pinned to Notification Center. For instance, pictures from search results can be dragged into a document.

==== iCloud Drive and Optimized Storage ====
This image shows what the Optimized Storage suggestions are.

iCloud Drive can upload the user's documents and desktop directories and sync them to other devices. The System Information application has a new section that gives the user detailed information about space usage per application or file and provides tools and suggestions for freeing up space. For instance, the user can let the system upload old files to iCloud Drive and remove their local copies, keeping them available on-demand in Finder. It can also remove old files from trash automatically. iTunes can delete watched, purchased films and TV programs from its library.

==== Auto Unlock and Universal Clipboard ====
Building upon Continuity, an "umbrella term [for] features that facilitate the communication between [Apple devices]" using Bluetooth and Wi-Fi, Sierra adds two features. With Auto Unlock, the user can unlock their user account by holding a paired Apple Watch close to the device. Time of flight is used to prevent relay attacks. Auto Unlock requires a Mac that was introduced in 2013 or later. With Universal Clipboard, the user can share the clipboard for cut, copy and paste between macOS Sierra and iOS 10 devices, including text and rich content, such as pictures or videos.

==== Tabs and Picture-in-Picture ====
Applications that support multiple windows can support multiple tabs within a single window, allowing the user to keep windows organized similarly to Safari. With Picture-in-Picture, videos can be played in a window that follows the user across the system.

==== Apple File System ====
Apple released a preview of a new file system in Sierra, called Apple File System (APFS), to overcome the limitations of HFS Plus. APFS is intended for solid-state drives and flash memory and adopts several features found in modern file systems, such as snapshots and cloning, as well as native support for features that Apple already provides in HFS Plus through supplementary software, such as file-system encryption and TRIM support. The file system was released in macOS High Sierra.

==== Night Shift ====
Night Shift is new in macOS 10.12.4, with the same functionality as its iOS counterpart. Night Shift reduces blue light at night to aid sleep. This can be scheduled in the System Preferences app (in the Displays menu) and can be toggled on or off in the Notification Center or using Siri.

Since this feature relies on the Metal framework, Night Shift is not available on all systems that support macOS Sierra.

=== Application features ===
==== Photos ====
Apple says it has improved the face recognition of the Photos application, adding object and scene recognition. It groups similar pictures together using faces, locations and object recognition to create "memories". Memories contain picture slideshows with transitions and music selected by the algorithm, which can be modified to the user's liking. The "People" album organizes photos by the people in them, and Places shows all photos on a world map.

==== Safari and Apple Pay ====
Safari provides an "extension point" which enables developers to bundle Safari extensions within their Cocoa applications and communicate with them directly from the applications. Safari conceals the presence of installed "legacy" plug-ins, such as Adobe Flash Player, Java applets, Microsoft Silverlight, and QuickTime – from websites and requires the user to enable a specific plug-in on a per-use or per-website basis.

Apple Pay allows vendors to embed an Apple Pay button on their websites. In Safari, users can click the Apple Pay button to check out, then complete a purchase using an iPhone or Apple Watch. Apple Pay requires a Mac that supports Continuity (2012 or later models) and either an iPhone 6 or later with iOS 10, or an Apple Watch with watchOS 3.

==== Messages ====
The Messages app adds aesthetic effects to messages, such as three times bigger emojis and click back with hearts or thumbs-up on a message bubble. The ability to play YouTube videos and preview links in a conversation was introduced. Users can view interactive content added to iMessage in iOS 10. The app also allows you to turn on or off read receipts on a conversation by conversation basis.

==== iTunes ====
Apple Music within iTunes has been redesigned, making it simpler to find favorite songs and discover new ones. A new "For You" tab has been added, which suggests new music the user might like (similar to the existing Genius). A refined MiniPlayer with the ability to view lyrics while listening has also been introduced.

==== Notes ====
The Notes app allows the user to share and collaborate on notes. This is done by clicking on a share button at the top of the window.

==== Other changes ====
- Disk Utility regains the ability to format and manage RAID sets, after it was removed in El Capitan.
- Finder has an option to show folders always at the top of the view hierarchy, for instance in list views.
- Mail adds a control to the top of email lists to quickly filter them, for instance, by read status or the presence of attachments.
- 13 & 15-inch Retina MacBook Pros now default to integer scaled over nearest-neighbor scaled resolutions to fit more content.

=== Security improvements ===
==== Gatekeeper ====
macOS Sierra slightly changes the Gatekeeper user interface and adds two new mechanisms. A new default in System Preferences hides the "Anywhere" option which allows the user to disable the mechanism and execute programs from any source without needing to approve each new one individually.

The first new mechanism allows developers to code-sign disk images that can be verified as a unit by the system. This allows developers to guarantee the integrity of external files that are distributed alongside the application bundle on the same disk image. An attacker could infect these external files with malicious code and with them exploit a vulnerability in the application, without having to break the signature of the application bundle itself. By signing the disk image, the developer can prevent tampering and force an attacker to repackage the files onto a new disk image, requiring a valid developer certificate to pass Gatekeeper without a warning.

The second new mechanism is "path randomization", which executes application bundles from a random, hidden path and prevents them from accessing external files relative to their location. To avoid this, the developer has to distribute the application bundle and its external files on a signed disk image or in a signed installer package. The user can avoid this mechanism by moving the application bundle without its external files to a new location.

==== Directory permissions and sudo ====
The Unix permissions for writing to the /Volumes directory are now restricted to root and no longer "world-writable". Apple expanded System Integrity Protection to /Library/Application Support/com.apple.TCC, a directory that contains a list of applications that are allowed to "control the computer", and restricts write access to programs which were signed with an Apple "private entitlement". The file-hosting service Dropbox has been criticized for manipulating the directory to add their Dropbox application to the list, rather than asking the user to do it for them explicitly in System Preferences.

The sudo command-line utility with which a user can execute a command as another user, typically as root, is configured with the "tty_tickets" flag by default, restricting the session timeout to the terminal session (such as a window or tab) in which the user authenticated the program.

=== Removed functionality ===
Sierra removes support for garbage collection from the Objective-C runtime, a memory-management system that was added in Mac OS X Leopard (version 10.5) and declared deprecated in favor of Automatic Reference Counting in OS X Mountain Lion (version 10.8). Applications that have been compiled with garbage collection will no longer run.

Apple removed native support for the VPN protocol PPTP and made recommendations for alternatives that it considers more secure.

The battery's "time remaining" estimate was removed in the 10.12.2 update after complaints of the battery life of 2016 MacBook Pros.

The Game Center app has been removed. However, the service still exists.

=== Reinstallation ===
Following the download of macOS Sierra (10.12) from the Mac App Store, the installer does not show under a user's "Purchased" tab in the Mac App Store app. Users can still re-download the Sierra installer by visiting the macOS Sierra page on the Mac App Store.

== Reception ==
macOS Sierra has received generally positive reviews. Users and critics have praised its functionality, including the addition of Siri and support for Apple Pay in Safari. Macworld gave it 4.5 stars out of 5. Engadget gave it a rating of 87 out of 100 praising the new features such as Siri integration, Universal Clipboard, and Apple Pay while criticizing the unreliability of Auto Unlock, that "Siri isn't always smart enough", and that some of the Messages features are only available on iOS 10. Developers of apps that rely on the PDFKit library built into macOS have complained that radical changes to PDFKit introduced in Sierra are causing instability and potential data corruption.

== Release history ==
Version	Build	Release date	Darwin version	Release notes	Standalone download
10.12	16A323	September 20, 2016	16.0.0	Original Mac App Store release	—N/a
10.12.1	16B2555	October 24, 2016	16.1.0	About the macOS Sierra 10.12.1 Update	macOS Sierra 10.12.1 Update
10.12.1	16B2657	October 27, 2016	16.1.0	About the macOS Sierra 10.12.1 Update	macOS Sierra 10.12.1 Update
10.12.2	16C67	December 13, 2016	16.3.0	About the macOS Sierra 10.12.2 Update	macOS Sierra 10.12.2 Update macOS Sierra 10.12.2 Combo Update
10.12.2	16C68	December 14, 2016	16.3.0	About the macOS Sierra 10.12.2 Update	macOS Sierra 10.12.2 Update macOS Sierra 10.12.2 Combo Update
10.12.3	16D32	January 23, 2017	16.4.0	About the macOS Sierra 10.12.3 Update	macOS Sierra 10.12.3 Update macOS Sierra 10.12.3 Combo Update
10.12.4	16E195	March 27, 2017	16.5.0	About the macOS Sierra 10.12.4 Update	macOS Sierra 10.12.4 Update macOS Sierra 10.12.4 Combo Update
10.12.5	16F73	May 15, 2017	16.6.0	About the macOS Sierra 10.12.5 Update	macOS Sierra 10.12.5 Update macOS Sierra 10.12.5 Combo Update
10.12.5	16F2073	June 5, 2017	16.6.0	About the macOS Sierra 10.12.5 Update	macOS Sierra 10.12.5 Update macOS Sierra 10.12.5 Combo Update
10.12.6	16G29	July 19, 2017	16.7.0	About the macOS Sierra 10.12.6 Update	macOS Sierra 10.12.6 Update macOS Sierra 10.12.6 Combo Update
10.12.6	16G1036	October 31, 2017	16.7.0	About the security content of Security Update 2017-001 Sierra	~~Security Update 2017-001 Sierra~~
10.12.6	16G1114	December 6, 2017	16.7.0	About the security content of Security Update 2017-002 Sierra	Security Update 2017-002 Sierra
10.12.6	16G1212	January 23, 2018	16.7.0	About the security content of Security Update 2018-001 Sierra	Security Update 2018-001 Sierra
10.12.6	16G1314	March 29, 2018	16.7.0	About the security content of Security Update 2018-002 Sierra	Security Update 2018-002 Sierra
10.12.6	16G1408	June 1, 2018	16.7.0	About the security content of Security Update 2018-003 Sierra	Security Update 2018-003 Sierra
10.12.6	16G1510	July 9, 2018	16.7.0	About the security content of Security Update 2018-004 Sierra	Security Update 2018-004 Sierra
10.12.6	16G1618	October 30, 2018	16.7.0	About the security content of Security Update 2018-005 Sierra	Security Update 2018-005 Sierra
10.12.6	16G1710	December 5, 2018	16.7.0	About the security content of Security Update 2018-006 Sierra	Security Update 2018-006 Sierra
10.12.6	16G1815	January 22, 2019	16.7.0	About the security content of Security Update 2019-001 Sierra	Security Update 2019-001 Sierra
10.12.6	16G1917	March 25, 2019	16.7.0	About the security content of Security Update 2019-002 Sierra	Security Update 2019-002 Sierra
10.12.6	16G1918	March 29, 2019	16.7.0	About the security content of Security Update 2019-002 Sierra	Security Update 2019-002 Sierra
10.12.6	16G2016	May 14, 2019	16.7.0	About the security content of Security Update 2019-003 Sierra	Security Update 2019-003 Sierra
10.12.6	~~16G2127~~	July 22, 2019	16.7.0	About the security content of Security Update 2019-004 Sierra	~~Security Update 2019-004 Sierra~~
10.12.6	16G2128	July 29, 2019	16.7.0	About the security content of Security Update 2019-004 Sierra	~~Security Update 2019-004 Sierra~~
10.12.6	16G2136	September 26, 2019	16.7.0	About the security content of Security Update 2019-005 Sierra	Security Update 2019-005 Sierra

== Timeline of Mac operating systems ==
Timeline of Mac operating systems

Preceded by OS X 10.11 (El Capitan)	macOS 10.12 (Sierra); 09/2016	Succeeded by macOS 10.13 (High Sierra)
