= Security Support Provider Interface =

Windows application programming interface

Security Support Provider Interface (SSPI) is a component of Windows API that performs security-related operations such as authentication.

SSPI functions as a common interface to several Security Support Providers (SSPs): A Security Support Provider is a dynamic-link library (DLL) that makes one or more security packages available to apps.

== Providers ==
The following SSPs are included in Windows:

- NTLMSSP (msv1_0.dll) – Introduced in Windows NT 3.51. Provides NTLM challenge/response authentication for Windows domains prior to Windows 2000 and for systems that are not part of a domain.
- Kerberos (kerberos.dll) – Introduced in Windows 2000 and updated in Windows Vista to support AES. Performs authentication for Windows domains in Windows 2000 and later.
- NegotiateSSP (secur32.dll) – Introduced in Windows 2000. Provides single sign-on capability, sometimes referred to as Integrated Windows Authentication (especially in the context of IIS). Prior to Windows 7, it tries Kerberos before falling back to NTLM. On Windows 7 and later, NEGOExts is introduced, which negotiates the use of installed custom SSPs which are supported on the client and server for authentication.
- Secure Channel (schannel.dll) – Introduced in Windows 2000 and updated in Windows Vista to support stronger AES encryption and ECC This provider uses SSL/TLS records to encrypt data payloads.
- TLS/SSL – Public key cryptography SSP that provides encryption and secure communication for authenticating clients and servers over the internet. Updated in Windows 7 to support TLS 1.2.
- Digest SSP (wdigest.dll) – Introduced in Windows XP. Provides challenge/response based HTTP and SASL authentication between Windows and non-Windows systems where Kerberos is not available.
- CredSSP (credssp.dll) – Introduced in Windows Vista and available on Windows XP SP3. Provides single sign-on and Network Level Authentication for Remote Desktop Services.
- Distributed Password Authentication (DPA, msapsspc.dll) – Introduced in Windows 2000. Provides internet authentication using digital certificates.
- Public Key Cryptography User-to-User (PKU2U, pku2u.dll) – Introduced in Windows 7. Provides peer-to-peer authentication using digital certificates between systems that are not part of a domain.

== Comparison ==
SSPI is a proprietary variant of Generic Security Services Application Program Interface (GSSAPI) with extensions and very Windows-specific data types. It shipped with Windows NT 3.51 and Windows 95 with the NTLMSSP. For Windows 2000, an implementation of Kerberos 5 was added, using token formats conforming to the official protocol standard RFC 1964 (The Kerberos 5 GSSAPI mechanism) and providing wire-level interoperability with Kerberos 5 implementations from other vendors.

The tokens generated and accepted by the SSPI are mostly compatible with the GSS-API so an SSPI client on Windows may be able to authenticate with a GSS-API server on Unix depending on the specific circumstances.

One significant shortcoming of SSPI is its lack of channel bindings, which makes some GSSAPI interoperability impossible.

Another fundamental difference between the IETF-defined GSSAPI and Microsoft's SSPI is the concept of "impersonation". In this model, a server can operate with the full privileges of the authenticated client, so that the operating system performs all access control checks, e.g. when opening new files. Whether these are less privileges or more privileges than that of the original service account depends entirely on the client. In the traditional (GSSAPI) model, when a server runs under a service account, it cannot elevate its privileges, and has to perform access control in a client-specific and application-specific fashion. The obvious negative security implications of the impersonation concept are prevented in Windows Vista by restricting impersonation to selected service accounts. Impersonation can be implemented in a Unix/Linux model using the seteuid or related system calls. While this means an unprivileged process cannot elevate its privileges, it also means that to take advantage of impersonation the process must run in the context of the root user account.
