= Choreographic programming =

Programming paradigm

In computer science, choreographic programming is a programming paradigm for distributed systems, where programs are written as compositions of interactions among multiple concurrent participants.

Deadlock is a common error that can occur in distributed systems. Choreographic programming ensures that deadlock cannot occur in the scope of the choreography by ensuring that every time a message is sent from one party, there is a corresponding receive on the other end.

== Overview ==
=== Choreographies ===
In choreographic programming, developers use a choreographic programming language to define the intended communication behaviour of concurrent participants. Programs in this paradigm are called choreographies. Choreographic languages are inspired by security protocol notation (also known as "Alice and Bob" notation). The key to these languages is the communication primitive, for example

Alice.expr -> Bob.x

reads "Alice communicates the result of evaluating the expression expr to Bob, which stores it in its local variable x". Alice, Bob, etc. are typically called roles or processes.

The example below shows a choreography for a simplified single sign-on (SSO) protocol based on a Central Authentication Service (CAS) that involves three roles:

- Client, which wishes to obtain an access token from CAS to interact with Service.
- Service, which needs to know from CAS if the Client should be given access.
- CAS, which is the Central Authentication Service responsible for checking the Client's credentials.

The choreography is:

Client.(credentials, serviceID) -> CAS.authRequest
if CAS.check(authRequest) then
    CAS.token = genToken(authRequest)
    CAS.Success(token) -> Client.result
    CAS.Success(token) -> Service.result
else
    CAS.Failure -> Client.result
    CAS.Failure -> Service.result

The choreography starts in Line 1, where Client communicates a pair consisting of some credentials and the identifier of the service it wishes to access to CAS. CAS stores this pair in its local variable authRequest (for authentication request). In Line 2, the CAS checks if the request is valid for obtaining an authentication token. If so, it generates a token and communicates a Success message containing the token to both Client and Service (Lines 3–5). Otherwise, the CAS informs Client and Service that authentication failed, by sending a Failure message (Lines 7–8). We refer to this choreography as the "SSO choreography" in the remainder.

=== Endpoint Projection ===
A key feature of choreographic programming is the capability of compiling choreographies to distributed implementations. These implementations can be libraries for software that needs to participate in a computer network by following a protocol, or standalone distributed programs.

The translation of a choreography into distributed programs is called endpoint projection (EPP for short).

Endpoint projection returns a program for each role described in the source choreography. For example, given the choreography above, endpoint projection would return three programs: one for Client, one for Service, and one for CAS. They are shown below in pseudocode form, where send and recv are primitives for sending and receiving messages to/from other roles.

Endpoint Projection (EPP) of the SSO choreography
Client

send (credentials, serviceID) to CAS
recv result from CAS

Service

recv result from CAS

CAS

recv authRequest from Client
if check(authRequest) then
    token = genToken(authRequest)
    send Success(token) to Client
    send Success(token) to Service
else
    send Failure to Client
    send Failure to Service

For each role, its code contains the actions that the role should execute to implement the choreography correctly together with the others.

== Development ==
The paradigm of choreographic programming originates from its titular PhD thesis. The inspiration for the syntax of choreographic programming languages can be traced back to security protocol notation, also known as "Alice and Bob" notation. Choreographic programming has also been heavily influenced by standards for service choreography and interaction diagrams, as well as developments of the theory of process calculi.

Choreographic programming is an active area of research. The paradigm has been used in the study of information flow, parallel computing, cyber-physical systems, runtime adaptation, and system integration.

== Languages ==
- AIOCJ (website). A choreographic programming language for adaptable systems that produces code in Jolie.
- Chor. A session-typed choreographic programming language that compiled to microservices in Jolie. In the meantime superseded by Choral.
- Choral (website). An object-oriented choreographic programming language that compiles to libraries in Java. Choral is the first choreographic programming language with decentralised data structures and higher-order parameters.
- Chorex (website). An Elixir library providing an embedded choreographic programming language through Elixir's macro system.
- ChoRus (website). Library-level choreographic programming in Rust.
- Core Choreographies. A core theoretical model for choreographic programming. A mechanised implementation is available in Rocq.
- HasChor (website). A library for choreographic programming in Haskell.
- Kalas. A choreographic programming language with a verified compiler to CakeML.
- Pirouette. A mechanised choreographic programming language theory with higher-order procedures.
- Klor (website). Library-level choreographic programming in Clojure.
- Tempo (website). A practical choreographic programming language that compiles to library source code for multiple target languages.
- Wyzer (website). A statically-typed, general-purpose, resource-oriented choreographic programming language that compiles to native code via LLVM, using a Perceus-based memory model for automatic memory management alongside its choreography features.

== See also ==
- Security protocol notation
- Sequence diagram
- Service choreography
- Structured concurrency
- Multitier programming
