= Pre-play attack =

Computer network security threat

In the field of security engineering, a pre-play attack is a cryptographic attack in which an attacker prepares for the attack in advance by carrying out a simulated transaction while pretending to be the device to be attacked, and then repeats the attack a second time with the real device at a time when it is likely to carry out the same series of operations as in the simulation. The technique relies on being able to guess the content of the transaction in advance, something usually made possible by a poor choice of unpredictability within the system. The name is a play on "replay attack". Pre-play attacks are not very effective and chances of success are slim.
