= Key distribution center =

In cryptography, a key distribution center (KDC) is part of a cryptosystem intended to reduce the risks inherent in exchanging keys. KDCs often operate in systems within which some users may have permission to use certain services at some times and not at others.

== Security overview ==
For instance, an administrator may have established a policy that only certain users may back up to tape. Many operating systems can control access to the tape facility via a "system service". If that system service further restricts the tape drive to operate only on behalf of users who can submit a service-granting ticket when they wish to use it, there remains only the task of distributing such tickets to the appropriately permitted users. If the ticket consists of (or includes) a key, one can then term the mechanism which distributes it a KDC. Usually, in such situations, the KDC itself also operates as a system service.

== Operation ==
A typical operation with a KDC involves a request from a user to use some service. The KDC will use cryptographic techniques, mostly using symmetric encryption, to authenticate requesting users as themselves. It will also check whether an individual user has the right to access the service requested. If the authenticated user meets all prescribed conditions, the KDC can issue a ticket permitting access.

In most (but not all) cases the KDC shares a key with each of all the other parties. The KDC produces a ticket based on a server key. The client receives the ticket and submits it to the appropriate server. The server can verify the submitted ticket and grant access to user submitting it.

== Examples ==
Security systems using KDCs include Kerberos. (Actually, Kerberos partitions KDC functionality between two different agents: the AS (Authentication Server) and the TGS (Ticket Granting Service).)
