= NTLMSSP =

Binary messaging protocol used by the Microsoft Security Support Provider Interface

NTLMSSP (NT LAN Manager (NTLM) Security Support Provider) is a binary messaging protocol used by the Microsoft Security Support Provider Interface (SSPI) to facilitate NTLM challenge-response authentication and to negotiate integrity and confidentiality options. NTLMSSP is used wherever SSPI authentication is used including Server Message Block / CIFS extended security authentication, HTTP Negotiate authentication (e.g. IIS with IWA turned on) and MSRPC services.

The NTLMSSP and NTLM challenge-response protocol have been documented in Microsoft's Open Protocol Specification.
