= Lone Pine Peak =

Mountain in the American state of California

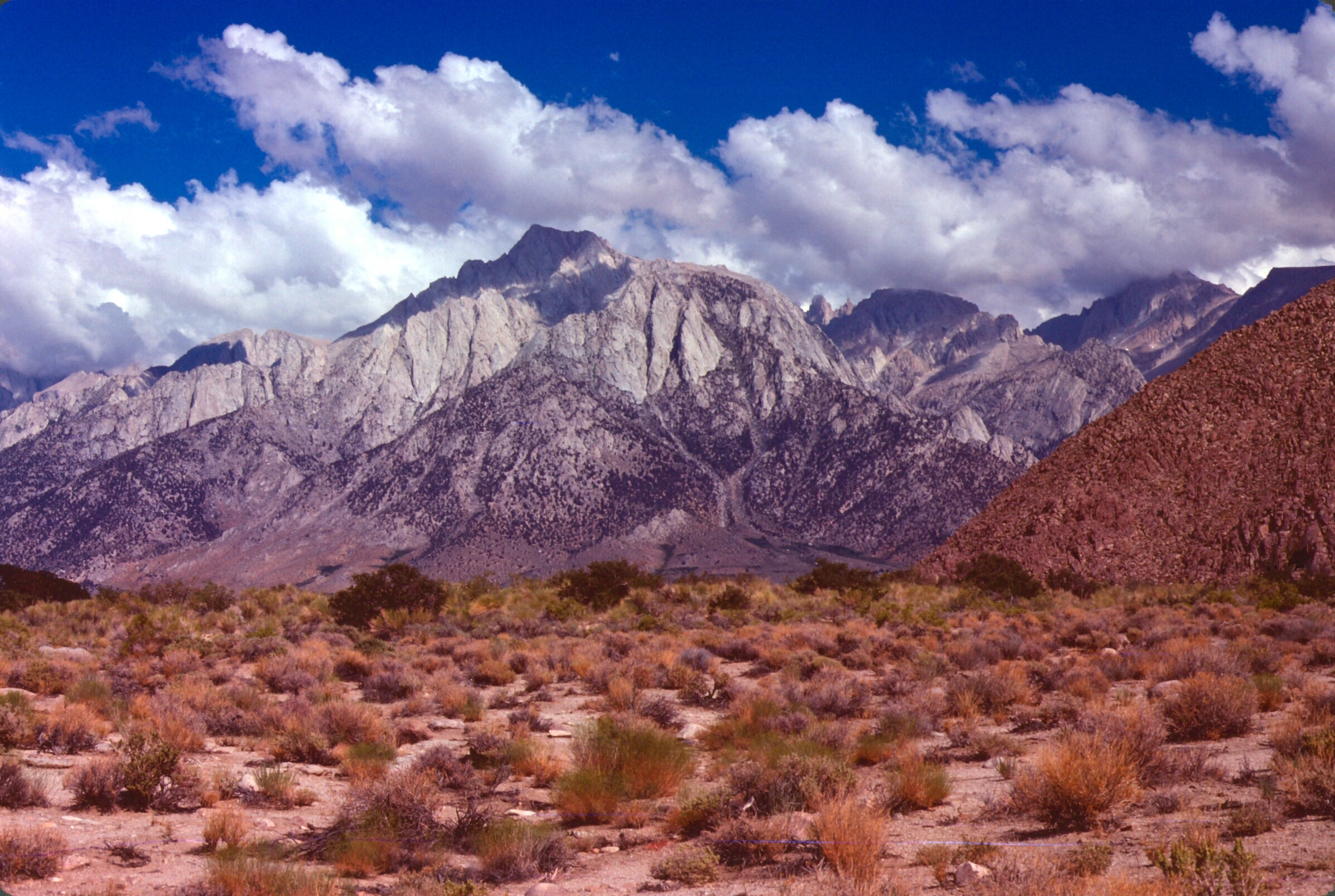
- Lone Pine Peak from the Owens Valley

Highest point
- Elevation: 12,949 ft (3,947 m) NAVD 88
- Prominence: 424 ft (129 m)
- Parent peak: Rosco Peak
- Listing: Sierra Peaks Section
- Coordinates: 36°33′42″N 118°13′30″W

Geography
- Location within California Location within the United States
- Location: Inyo County, California, U.S.
- Parent range: Sierra Nevada
- Topo map: USGS Mount Langley

Climbing
- First ascent: 1925 by Norman Clyde
- Easiest route: Scramble, class 2

Lone Pine Peak is located on the east side of the Sierra Nevada range just west of the town of Lone Pine, California in Inyo County, in eastern California in the southwestern United States. The summit marks the eastern boundary of the John Muir Wilderness in the Inyo National Forest. Lone Pine Peak is the mountain in the photo for the default desktop wallpaper of macOS Sierra.
