= SPNEGO =

Security protocol used with GSSAPI

Simple and Protected GSSAPI Negotiation Mechanism (SPNEGO), often pronounced "spenay-go", is a GSSAPI "pseudo mechanism" used by client-server software to negotiate the choice of security technology. SPNEGO is used when a client application wants to authenticate to a remote server, but neither end is sure what authentication protocols the other supports. The pseudo-mechanism uses a protocol to determine what common GSSAPI mechanisms are available, selects one and then dispatches all further security operations to it. This can help organizations deploy new security mechanisms in a phased manner.

SPNEGO's most visible use is in Microsoft's "HTTP Negotiate" authentication extension. It was first implemented in Internet Explorer 5.01 and IIS 5.0 and provided single sign-on capability later marketed as Integrated Windows Authentication. The negotiable sub-mechanisms included NTLM and Kerberos, both used in Active Directory. The HTTP Negotiate extension was later implemented with similar support in:

- Mozilla 1.7 beta
- Mozilla Firefox 0.9
- Konqueror 3.3.1
- Google Chrome 6.0.472

== History ==
- 19 February 1996 – Eric Baize and Denis Pinkas publish the Internet Draft Simple GSS-API Negotiation Mechanism (draft-ietf-cat-snego-01.txt).
- 17 October 1996 – The mechanism is assigned the object identifier 1.3.6.1.5.5.2 and is abbreviated snego.
- 25 March 1997 – Optimistic piggybacking of one mechanism's initial token is added. This saves a round trip.
- 22 April 1997 – The "preferred" mechanism concept is introduced. The draft standard's name is changed from just "Simple" to "Simple and Protected" (spnego).
- 16 May 1997 – Context flags are added (delegation, mutual auth, etc.). Defenses are provided against attacks on the new "preferred" mechanism.
- 22 July 1997 – More context flags are added (integrity and confidentiality).
- 18 November 1998 – The rules of selecting the common mechanism are relaxed. Mechanism preference is integrated into the mechanism list.
- 4 March 1998 – An optimisation is made for an odd number of exchanges. The mechanism list itself is made optional.
- December 1998 (Final) – DER encoding is chosen to disambiguate how the MIC is calculated. The draft is submitted for standardisation as RFC 2478.
- October 2005 – Interoperability with Microsoft implementations is addressed. Some constraints are improved and clarified and defects corrected. Published as RFC 4178, although it is now non-interoperable with strict implementations of now-obsoleted RFC 2478.
