= Alice and Bob =

Placeholder characters

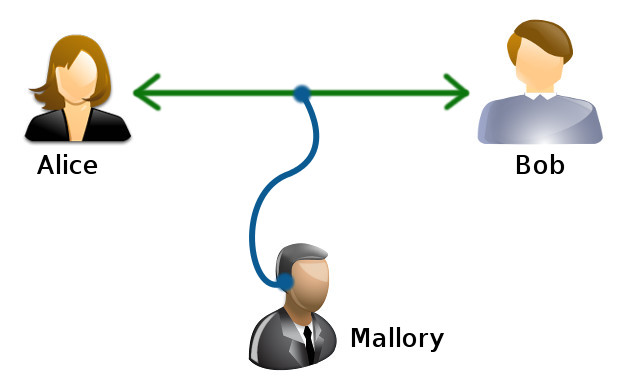
Example scenario where communication between Alice and Bob is intercepted by Mallory

Alice and Bob are fictional characters commonly used as placeholders in discussions about cryptographic systems and protocols, and in other science and engineering literature where there are several participants in a thought experiment. The Alice and Bob characters were created by Ron Rivest, Adi Shamir, and Leonard Adleman in their 1978 paper "A Method for Obtaining Digital Signatures and Public-key Cryptosystems". Subsequently, they have become common archetypes in many scientific and engineering fields, such as quantum cryptography, game theory and physics. As the use of Alice and Bob became more widespread, additional characters were added, sometimes with particular meanings. These characters do not have to refer to people; they refer to generic agents which might be different computers or even different programs running on a single computer.

== Overview ==
An example of an "Alice and Bob" used in cryptography

Alice and Bob are the names of fictional characters used for convenience and to aid comprehension. For example, "How can Bob send a private message M to Alice in a public-key cryptosystem?" is believed to be easier to describe and understand than if the hypothetical people were simply named A and B as in "How can B send a private message M to A in a public-key cryptosystem?"

The names are conventional, and where relevant may use an alliterative mnemonic such as "Mallory" for "malicious" to associate the name with the typical role of that person.

Alice and Bob also have different genders, making it easier to differentiate them using gendered pronouns alone.

== History ==
Scientific papers about thought experiments with several participants often used letters to identify them: A, B, C, etc.

The first mention of Alice and Bob in the context of cryptography was in Rivest, Shamir, and Adleman's 1978 article "A method for obtaining digital signatures and public-key cryptosystems." They wrote, "For our scenarios we suppose that A and B (also known as Alice and Bob) are two users of a public-key cryptosystem". Previous to this article, cryptographers typically referred to message senders and receivers as A and B, or other simple symbols. In fact, in the two previous articles by Rivest, Shamir, and Adleman, introducing the RSA cryptosystem, there is no mention of Alice and Bob. The choice of the first three names may have come from the 1969 film Bob & Carol & Ted & Alice.

Within a few years, however, references to Alice and Bob in cryptological literature became a common trope. Cryptographers would often begin their academic papers with reference to Alice and Bob. For instance, Michael Rabin began his 1981 paper, "Bob and Alice each have a secret, SB and SA, respectively, which they want to exchange." Early on, Alice and Bob were starting to appear in other domains, such as in Manuel Blum's 1981 article, "Coin Flipping by Telephone: A Protocol for Solving Impossible Problems," which begins, "Alice and Bob want to flip a coin by telephone."

Although Alice and Bob were invented with no reference to their personality, authors soon began adding colorful descriptions. In 1983, Blum invented a backstory about a troubled relationship between Alice and Bob, writing, "Alice and Bob, recently divorced, mutually distrustful, still do business together. They live on opposite coasts, communicate mainly by telephone, and use their computers to transact business over the telephone." In 1984, John Gordon delivered his famous "After Dinner Speech" about Alice and Bob, which he imagined to be the first "definitive biography of Alice and Bob."

In addition to adding backstories and personalities to Alice and Bob, authors soon added other characters, with their own personalities. The first to be added was Eve, the "eavesdropper." Eve was invented in 1988 by Charles Bennet, Gilles Brassard, and Jean-Marc Robert, in their paper, "Privacy Amplification by Public Discussion." In Bruce Schneier's book Applied Cryptography, other characters are listed.

== Cast of characters ==
=== Cryptographic systems ===
The most common characters are Alice and Bob. Eve, Mallory, and Trent are also common names, and have fairly well-established "personalities" (or functions). The names often use alliterative mnemonics (for example, Eve, "eavesdropper"; Mallory, "malicious") where different players have different motives. Other names are much less common and more flexible in use. Sometimes the genders are alternated: Alice, Bob, Carol, Dave, Eve, etc.

| Alice and Bob | The original, generic characters. Generally, Alice and Bob want to exchange a message or cryptographic key. |
| Carol, Carlos or Charlie | A generic third participant. |
| Chuck or Chad | A third participant, usually of malicious intent. |
| Craig | A password cracker, often encountered in situations with stored passwords. |
| Dan, Dave or David | A generic fourth participant. |
| Erin | A generic fifth participant, but rarely used, as "E" is usually reserved for Eve. |
| Eve or Yves | An eavesdropper, who is usually a passive attacker, Eve may also have the power to suppress, modify, and inject modifications indiscriminately. In quantum cryptography, Eve may also represent the environment. |
| Faythe | A trusted advisor, courier or intermediary. Faythe is used infrequently, and is associated with faith and faithfulness. Faythe may be a repository of key service or courier of shared secrets. |
| Frank | A generic sixth participant. |
| Grace | A government representative. For example, Grace may try to force Alice or Bob to implement backdoors in their protocols. Grace may also deliberately weaken standards. |
| Heidi | A mischievous designer for cryptographic standards, but rarely used. |
| Ivan | An issuer, mentioned first by Ian Grigg in the context of Ricardian contracts. |
| Judy | A judge who may be called upon to resolve a potential dispute between participants. See Judge Judy. |
| Mallory or (less commonly) Mallet or Darth | A malicious attacker. Associated with Trudy, an intruder. Unlike the passive Eve, Mallory is an active attacker (often used in man-in-the-middle attacks), who can modify messages, substitute messages, or replay old messages. The difficulty of securing a system against a Mallory is much greater than against an Eve. |
| Michael or Mike | Used as an alternative to the eavesdropper Eve, from microphone. |
| Niaj | Used as an alternative to the eavesdropper Eve in several South Asian nations. |
| Olivia | An oracle, who responds to queries from other participants. Olivia often acts as a "black box" with some concealed state or information, or as a random oracle. |
| Oscar | An opponent, similar to Mallory, but not necessarily malicious. |
| Peggy or Pat | A prover, who interacts with the verifier to show that the intended transaction has actually taken place. Peggy is often found in zero-knowledge proofs. |
| Rupert | A repudiator who appears for interactions that desire non-repudiation. |
| Sybil | A pseudonymous attacker, who usually uses a large number of identities. For example, Sybil may attempt to subvert a reputation system. See Sybil attack. |
| Trent or Ted | A trusted arbitrator, who acts as a neutral third party. |
| Trudy | An intruder. |
| Victor or Vanna | A verifier, who requires proof from the prover. |
| Walter | A warden, who may guard Alice and Bob. |
| Wendy | A whistleblower, who is an insider with privileged access capable of divulging information. |

=== Interactive proof systems ===
For interactive proof systems there are other characters:

| Arthur and Merlin | Merlin provides answers, and Arthur asks questions. Merlin has unbounded computational ability (like the wizard Merlin). In interactive proof systems, Merlin claims the truth of a statement, and Arthur (like King Arthur), questions him to verify the claim. |
| Paul and Carole | Paul asks questions, and Carole provides answers. In the solution of the Twenty Questions problem, Paul (standing in for Paul Erdős) asked questions and Carole (an anagram of "oracle") answered them. Paul and Carole were also used in combinatorial games, in the roles of pusher and chooser. |
| Arthur and Bertha | Arthur is the "left", "black", or "vertical" player, and Bertha is the "right", "white", or "horizontal" player in a combinatorial game. Additionally, Arthur, given the same outcome, prefers a game to take the fewest moves, while Bertha prefers a game to take the most moves. |

=== Physics ===
The names Alice and Bob are often used to name the participants in thought experiments in physics. More alphabetical names, usually of alternating gender, are used as required, e.g. "Alice and Bob (and Carol and Dave and Eve)".

In experiments involving robotic systems, the terms "Alice Robot" and "Bob Robot" refer to mobile platforms responsible for transmitting quantum information and receiving it with quantum detectors, respectively, within the context of the field of quantum robotics.

== See also ==
- Diffie–Hellman key exchange
- Martin Gardner
- Public-key cryptography
- Security protocol notation
- Unobtanium
