= Certificate Authority Security Council =

Organization

- Abbreviation: CASC
- Formation: February 2013
- Type: Industry Advocacy Organization
- Purpose: Exploration and promotion of best practices that advance trusted SSL deployment and CA operations as well as the security of the Internet in general
- Region served: Worldwide
- Members: 7 publicly trusted PKI authorities
- Website: casecurity.org

The Certificate Authority Security Council (CASC) is a multi-vendor industry advocacy group created to conduct research, promote Internet security standards and educate the public on Internet security issues.

== History ==
The group was founded in February 2013 with the seven largest certificate authorities, issuers of SSL certificates — Comodo, Symantec, Trend Micro, DigiCert, Entrust, GlobalSign and GoDaddy. DigiCert withdrew from the group June 15, 2018.

== Objectives ==
The CASC supports the efforts of the CA/Browser Forum and other standards-setting bodies. They support the development of enhancements that improve the Secure Sockets Layer (SSL) and the operations of the certificate authorities (CA).

According to Robin Alden, CTO of Comodo and member of the Council, the CASC will serve as a united front for all of the CAs involved: "While not a standards-setting organization, we’re committed to supplementing standards-setting organizations by providing education, research, and advocacy on the best practices and use of SSL."

== Membership requirements ==
The CASC limits membership to SSL certificate authorities that meet their requirements for reputation, operation, and security. Members are required to undergo an annual audit and to adhere to industry standards, such as the CA/Browser Forum’s Baseline Requirements and Network Security Guidelines.

== Industry initiatives ==
The group works collaboratively to create and define the initiatives to improve the understanding of policies and their impact on Internet infrastructure.

=== Certificate Revocation and OCSP Stapling ===
The group's primary focus was promoting an understanding of the importance of certificate revocation checking and the benefits of OCSP stapling. The protocol is intended to ensure that web users are aware when they visit a web site with a revoked or expired SSL certificate.

=== Securing Software Distribution with Digital Code Signing ===
The group has also worked to secure software distribution with digital code signing. Code signing certificates play a key role in helping users identify authentic software code from reputable publishers and receive the assurance that the code has not been tampered with beforehand.
