= Safelayer Secure Communications =

Spanish software developer company

Safelayer Secure Communications S.A.
- Company type: Joint Stock Company
- Industry: Online information and identity protection
- Founded: 1999; 27 years ago
- Headquarters: Barcelona, Spain
- Products: KeyOne CA KeyOne VA; KeyOne TSA; KeyOne XRA; Safelayer Mobile ID; TrustedX eIDAS Platform; TrustedX Authentication Platform; TrustedX Electronic Signature TrustedX Encryption Key Management
- Website: www.safelayer.com

Safelayer Secure Communications S.A. is a Spanish private company founded in May 1999. It develops software products on the public key infrastructure area (digital security for identity management, electronic signature and data protection). Safelayer's technology is part of the three major certification and digital identity projects in Spain: Fábrica Nacional de Moneda y Timbre, the Spanish ID card DNI electrónico and the Spanish E-passport. Safelayer's technology also secures the NATO X400 messaging system.

Safelayer's technology has been EAL2 and EAL4+ Common Criteria certified. Currently, Safelayer is the only company with a whole family of products that are CC EAL4+ certified.

== Products ==
- KeyOne CA: Certificate authority.
- KeyOne VA: Validation authority (OCSP responder) based on standard protocol OCSP from IETF.
- KeyOne TSA: Time-stamping authority (Trusted Timestamping) based on standard protocol TSP from IETF.
- KeyOne XRA: Registration authority.
- TrustedX eIDAS platform.
- TrustedX Authentication platform.
- TrustedX Electronic signature.
- TrustedX Encryption key management.
