= Validation authority =

Entity that verify the validity of digital certificate

In public key infrastructure, a validation authority (VA) is an entity that provides a service used to verify the validity or revocation status of a digital certificate per the mechanisms described in the X.509 standard and RFC 5280 (page 69).

== Application ==
The dominant method used for this purpose is to host a certificate revocation list (CRL) for download via the HTTP or LDAP protocols. To reduce the amount of network traffic required for certificate validation, the OCSP protocol may be used instead.

== Advantages ==
While this is a potentially labor-intensive process, the use of a dedicated validation authority allows for dynamic validation of certificates issued by an offline root certificate authority. While the root CA itself will be unavailable to network traffic, certificates issued by it can always be verified via the validation authority and the protocols mentioned above.

The ongoing administrative overhead of maintaining the CRLs hosted by the validation authority is typically minimal, as it is uncommon for root CAs to issue (or revoke) large numbers of certificates.

== Limitations ==
While a validation authority is capable of responding to a network-based request for a CRL, it lacks the ability to issue or revoke certificates. It must be continuously updated with current CRL information from a certificate authority which issued the certificates contained within the CRL.
