= Netrust =

Singaporean company (founded 1997)

Netrust Pte Ltd
- Type: Private
- Industry: Computer software
- Founded: Singapore (1997)
- Headquarters: 19 Tai Seng Avenue, #05-01, Singapore 534054, Singapore
- Website: https://www.netrust.net

Netrust was established in July 1997 as the first certificate authority in Southeast Asia. Netrust provides individuals, businesses and government organisations with online identification and security infrastructure for secure electronic transactions via the Internet and other wireless media.

In its capacity as a certificate authority, Netrust acts as a trusted third party that issues and manages digital certificates. Netrust maintains a Public Key Infrastructure (PKI) certification service and in its CA role creates and signs X.509 digital certificates which bind individuals, organisations and application servers with the particular public key of each subscriber.
