= Bill Conner =

American businessman

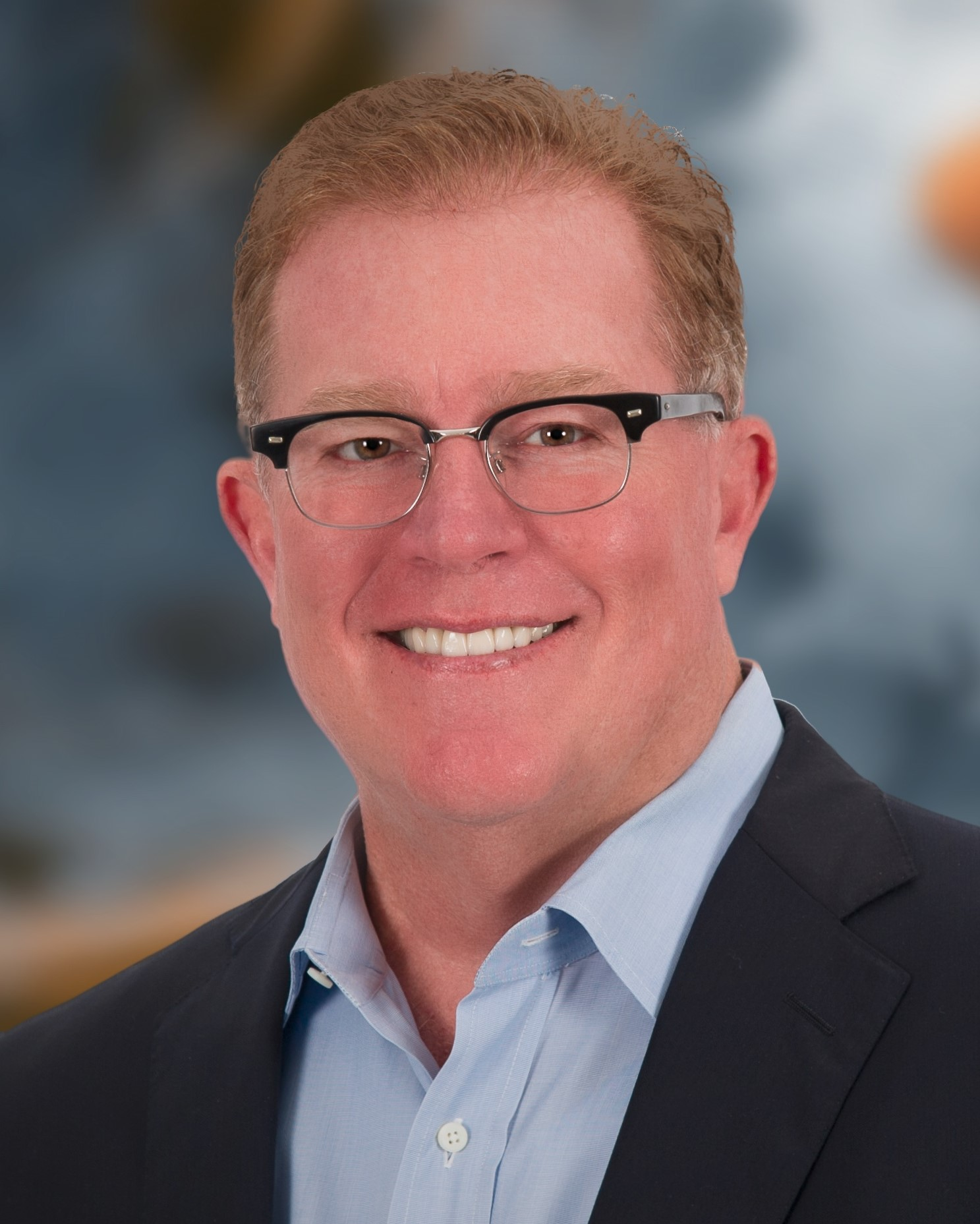
- Conner in 2018
- Education: Wharton School, University of Pennsylvania, Princeton University
- Occupation: Business executive

F. William Conner is an American business executive.

== Early life and education ==
Conner was born and raised in West Helena, Arkansas. In 1981, he received his bachelor's degree in mechanical engineering from Princeton University. In 1987, he earned an MBA from the Wharton School of the University of Pennsylvania.

== Career ==
In 1981, Conner began his career at AT&T. Over the next 11 years, he held titles of senior engineer, operations manager, and strategic planner, among others.

From 1992 to 2001, Conner held executive positions at Nortel Networks. As the president of Nortel's Enterprise Data Networks, Conner managed its US$9.1 billion acquisition of Bay Networks. As Nortel's first chief marketing officer, he launched the global marketing campaigns "Come Together" and "What Do You Want the Internet to Be?"

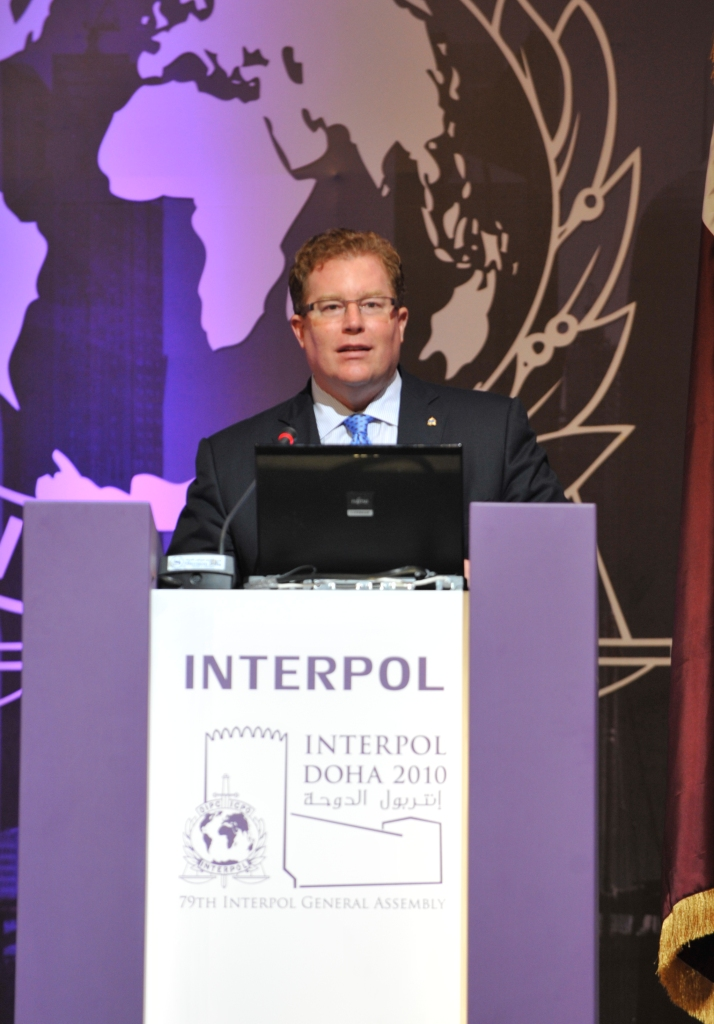
Conner speaking on global cybersecurity before the INTERPOL 79th General Assembly in Doha, Qatar, November 2010

In 2001, Conner moved into the creation and delivery of identity-based security and services as the chief executive officer and president of Entrust, a private software company.

Conner engineered the company's acquisition by private equity firm, Thoma Bravo, in 2009, and transitioned Entrust into a private firm. In December 2013, it was announced that Datacard Group had entered into an agreement to purchase Entrust for a reported $500 million. Conner took on a consultant role during the transition.

On January 5, 2015, Silent Circle announced that Conner had been appointed as its chief executive officer, a member of Silent Circle's board of directors, and a member of the board of directors of Blackphone, a secure mobile handset developed by a subsidiary of Silent Circle. On June 17, 2016, Silent Circle blogged that Conner had resigned as CEO and would remain only as an "advisor."

Conner joined SonicWall as president and CEO on November 1, 2016. Formerly a division of Dell Software Inc., SonicWall had been spun off and acquired by Francisco Partners and Elliott Management in June 2016. In October 2017, Francisco Partners acquired Comodo Certification Authority (Comodo CA) and named Conner chairman of the board. In September 2018, Conner outlined the rapid growth in non-standard port threats and explained a business reorganization to serve both the SME and enterprise business markets by focusing on the enterprise verticals of retail, education and government.

In April 2020, Conner introduced SonicWall's new computer security model, the Boundless Cybersecurity model, in response to heightened cybersecurity concerns as remote and hybrid work became increasingly common amid the COVID-19 pandemic. On July 21, 2022, Conner moved to a new role as executive chairman of the board.

Conner was president and CEO of Jitterbit from February 2024 to August 2026.

== Professional affiliations and projects ==
Conner has been active in various public-private partnerships on cybersecurity, cybertheft, and infrastructure security. He helped unveil the INTERPOL Global Smart eID Card and addressed the United Nations on global challenges in cybercrime in June 2010. He co-chaired the Corporate Governance Task Force of the U.S. Department of Homeland Security National Cybersecurity Partnership and was a member of the Cyber Security Industry Alliance (now a branch of TechAmerica technology trade association). Conner was also a member of the Business Software Alliance (BSA), and he created and co-chaired the BSA's Information Security Governance Task Force.

In February 2012, Conner took part in a hearing by the United States House of Representatives Committee on Energy and Commerce to discuss cybersecurity threats facing the U.S. and the role public-private partnerships play in defense. Conner has recently spent time discussing the effects of spear phishing schemes on weak authentication, notably the rash of attacks on media outlets and the risks of insider threats.

In 2016, Conner became a Forbes community voice contributor as a member of the Forbes Technology Council, and articles to which he has contributed have featured topics such as cybersecurity and policy trends, cyber threat intelligence, and how human predictability factors into cyberattacks. He has also written articles and contributed to reports on email-borne cyberattacks and ransomware.

== Awards and honors ==
- SC Media Reboot Leadership Award (2017)
- Insights Success 10 Most Admired CEOs to Watch (2018)
- Info Security Products Guide CEO of the Year (500–2,499 Employees): Gold Winner (2018)
- CEO World Awards CEO of the Year (500–2,499 Employees): Silver Winner (2018)
- CRN's Top 25 IT Innovators (2021)
- SC Awards Finalist: Security Executive of the Year (2022)
