= Key transparency =

Key transparency allows communicating parties to verify public keys used in end-to-end encryption. In many end-to-end encryption services, to initiate communication a user will reach out to a central server and request the public keys of the user with whom they wish to communicate. If the central server is malicious or becomes compromised, a man-in-the-middle attack can be launched through the issuance of incorrect public keys. The communications can then be intercepted and manipulated. Additionally, legal pressure could be applied by surveillance agencies to manipulate public keys and read messages.

With key transparency, public keys are posted to a public log that can be universally audited. Communicating parties can verify public keys used are accurate.

== See also ==
- Certificate Transparency
