= Neal Creighton Sr. =

United States Army general (1930–2020)

- Born: July 11, 1930; Fort Sill, Oklahoma
- Died: September 15, 2020 (aged 90)
- Military career
- Allegiance: United States
- Branch: United States Army
- Service years: 1953–1984
- Rank: Major General
- Commands: 1st Infantry Division; 3rd Squadron, 11th Armored Cavalry Regiment
- Conflicts: Vietnam War
- Awards: Army Distinguished Service Medal; Silver Star; Defense Superior Service Medal; Legion of Merit (3)

Neal Creighton Sr. (July 11, 1930 - September 15, 2020) was a retired major general of the United States Army who led the 3rd Squadron, 11th Armored Cavalry Regiment during the 1968 Tet Offensive in the Vietnam War. Creighton was also the CEO and president of The Robert R. McCormick Tribune Foundation from 1986 to 1999.

Creighton's son, Neal Creighton Jr., is an entrepreneur.
