= GeoTrust =

Digital certificate provider

Geotrust
- Product type: Public key certificates
- Current owner: DigiCert
- Country: United States
- Markets: World
- Website: www.geotrust.com

GeoTrust is a digital certificate provider. The GeoTrust brand was bought by Symantec from Verisign in 2010, but agreed to sell the certificate business (including GeoTrust) in August 2017 to private equity and growth capital firm Thoma Bravo LLC. GeoTrust was the first certificate authority to use the domain-validated certificate method which accounts for 70 percent of all SSL certificates on the Internet. By 2006, GeoTrust was the 2nd largest certificate authority in the world with 26.7 percent market share according to independent survey company Netcraft.

== History ==
GeoTrust was the first certificate authority to use the domain-validated certificate method US Granted 8028162, Douglas D. Beattie & Christopher T. M. Bailey, "Methods and systems for automated authentication, processing and issuance of digital certificates", published September 27, 2011, assigned to GeoTrust which is now widely accepted and used by all certificate authorities including Let's Encrypt. GeoTrust was a restarted company in 2001 that acquired the security business of Equifax. The Equifax business was the basis of its fast growth. The founders of the restarted company were CEO Neal Creighton, CTO Chris Bailey and Principal Engineer Kefeng Chen. Having no previous fund raising experience Creighton, Bailey and Chen used an existing company as the vehicle to acquire the business they had started at Equifax. The buyout of the Equifax certificate business was inexpensive given the final exit price in 2006.

VeriSign acquired GeoTrust on 5 September 2006 for $125 million. The main investor was St. Paul Venture Capital/VesBridge. ACG/ Mass High tech named VeriSign's acquisition of GeoTrust as the sell side deal of the year for 2006.

Symantec acquired the GeoTrust brand in 2010 as part of its $1.28 billion acquisition of Verisign security business.

Previous logo until 2020.

Symantec announced the sale of its entire certificate business in August 2017 to Thoma Bravo LLC for $1 billion with the intention of merging it with DigiCert. Thoma Bravo merged GeoTrust into DigiCert and GeoTrust is now owned by DigiCert.

== Root Certificate Untrust ==
Following a dispute with Google the GeoTrust Root Certificate became untrusted.

- On July 27, 2017, Google posted a plan regarding Symantec-issued (GeoTrust) TLS server certificates with Intent to Deprecate and Remove:
  - December 1, 2017; all GeoTrust certificates must be issued from a new PKI infrastructure in order for such certificates to be trusted in Google Chrome.
  - On March 15, 2018; Google Chrome will show a warning for sites secured with SSL/TLS certificates issued before June 1, 2016.
  - On September 13, 2018; Google Chrome will show a warning for sites secured with SSL/TLS certificates issued by Symantec’s existing PKI infrastructure.

Beginning 1st December 2017 GeoTrust has been issuing all Certificates under the DigiCert Trusted Root TLS Certificate.
