= Sectigo =

American cybersecurity company

- Formerly: Comodo Certificate Authority (Comodo CA)
- Type: Private
- Industry: Computer security
- Headquarters: Scottsdale, Arizona, United States
- Key people: Kevin Weiss (CEO)
- Number of employees: 450 (2021)
- Parent: GI Partners
- Website: sectigo.com

Sectigo is an American cybersecurity company specializing in digital certificates and automated certificate lifecycle management. It is one of the ten largest certificate authorities. It provides public root certificates distributed with operating systems, and it issues public key certificates for websites. Formerly known as Comodo Certification Authority (Comodo CA), the company was founded under Comodo Group and was later acquired by Francisco Partners in 2017 and by GI Partners in 2020. Comodo CA was rebranded to Sectigo in 2018. The company has been headquartered in Scottsdale, Arizona since 2023.

== History and operations ==
=== Comodo CA ===
Sectigo was established as Comodo Certification Authority (Comodo CA), a certificate authority (CA) business under the parent company Comodo Group, which was founded by Melih Abdulhayoğlu in 1998. Comodo Group and Comodo CA contributed to the Internet Engineering Task Force standard for DNS Certification Authority Authorization Resource Records.

In March 2011, a user account with an affiliate registration authority was compromised and was used to create a new user account that issued nine certificate signing requests. See Xcitium § Certificate hacking.

In 2016, Comodo CA launched the cloud-based Comodo Certificate Manager, a digital certificate management platform to help companies manage Internet of things (IoT) devices.

Comodo CA was acquired by Francisco Partners in 2017. Comodo CA and Comodo Group were legally and operationally separated. Abdulhayoğlu kept a minority ownership stake, took an observer role on Comodo CA's board of directors, and continued to operate Comodo Group as a distinct security business. (Comodo Group rebranded as Xcitium in 2022.) As part of the 2017 purchase, Bill Holtz became the CEO, and Bill Conner of the cybersecurity company SonicWall was named the chair.

The Comodo CA business initially continued with the Comodo brand, as leadership considered a rebrand. Comodo CA issued approximately 55 million certificates in 2017, bringing the total number of certificates issued to approximately 91 million, distributed to approximately 200,000 customers in 150 countries. In 2018, the company acquired Atlanta-based CodeGuard to help customers protect websites from malware via backup, IT disaster recovery, and maintenance.

=== Sectigo ===
Comodo CA rebranded as Sectigo in 2018, in part to avoid confusion with the parts of Comodo Group not acquired by Francisco Partners. The company also began supporting IoT devices and introduced new products in 2018. In 2019, Sectigo announced changes to its channel partner program and launched additional certifications, products, rewards, and tools. The company also acquired the West Des Moines, Iowa-based IoT security provider Icon Labs, which merged with Sectigo's IoT Security Platform and continued as a brand and subsidiary under Sectigo.

GI Partners acquired Sectigo in 2020. Sectigo had approximately 700,000 customers at the time. In late 2020, Sectigo announced the purchase of the SSL certificate and web security provider SSL247, which operated in Europe and Latin America, as well as the Netherlands-based SSL certificates and digital signatures provider Xolphin. Both of the businesses initially continued to operate as brands under Sectigo.

Sectigo acquired Scottsdale-based SiteLock in 2021. SiteLock had approximately 70 employees in the Phoenix metropolitan area. The acquisition of SiteLock increased Sectigo's employee count to 450 globally. Previously based in Roseland, New Jersey, Sectigo has been headquartered in Scottsdale since 2023. Approximately 26 employees, including 13 programmers and software engineers, work in the Phoenix metropolitan area as of 2025.

Sectigo acquired Entrust's public certificate business in early 2025. Prior to the purchase, Entrust allowed its customers to use certificates from Sectigo. The migration of Entrust's public certificate business included over half a million certificates and was completed in September 2025. Sectigo also began offering Certificates as a Service (CaaS) in 2025. In 2026, Sectigo began offering Sectigo Partner Platform, a multi-tenant platform intended for use by managed service providers and channel partners to manage digital certificates and related lifecycle processes.

Sectigo is a Certificate Transparency log provider.
