= Melih Abdulhayoğlu =

Turkish-American entrepreneur

Melih Abdulhayoglu
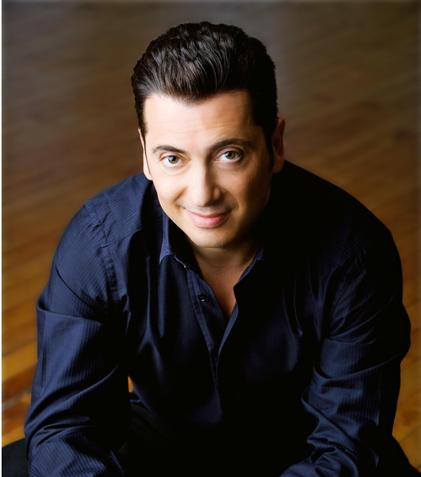
- Born: 10 March 1968 (age 58); Hatay, Turkey
- Education: University of Bradford (UK); BS Electronic Engineering, 1991
- Occupations: Technologist, Entrepreneur
- Known for: Founder & Chairman of Comodo
- Website: melih.com

Melih Abdulhayoğlu (born 10 March 1968) is the CEO of MAVeCap, an incubator Venture capital firm funded by his family office. His first company was Comodo Group, which is now branded as Xcitium. Another part of the company, the Comodo certificate authority, is now branded as Sectigo.

== Early life ==
Melih Abdulhayoglu was born in Turkey, where he studied at a Hatay high school. At the age of 18, he moved to the United Kingdom, where he earned a Bachelor of Science in Electronic Engineering from the University of Bradford in 1991.

== Career ==
Abdulhayoglu is the founder of Comodo, an internet security company, and established the industry standards organization CA/Browser Forum in 2005, initially to promote new standards that resulted in the creation of Extended Validation SSL Certificates.

In 2009, Abdulhayoglu organized the Common Computing Security Standards Forum, initially to deal with the problem of faux antivirus software being used by cyber-criminals.

Abdulhayoglu is featured in Forbes Turkey's 12th "100 Richest Turks" list, announced in March 2017. Forbes announced that he is estimated net worth of US$1.6 billion as of April 2018.
