= Common Computing Security Standards Forum =

- Founded: 2009
- Founder: Melih Abdulhayoğlu
- Type: Professional Organization
- Purpose: Providing internet security industry standards and protecting end users
- Location: Jersey City, New Jersey, United States
- Website: www.ccssforum.org

Common Computing Security Standards Forum (CCSS Forum) is a voluntary organization of vendors and providers of security software, operating systems, and web browsers.

== Goals ==
The CCSS Forum was formed with the following goals:

- Mitigating the risk of malicious intent and software,
- Creating standards for the industry, and
- Including all security providers in order to maximize the benefit and protection of the end users.

== History ==
In 2009, Melih Abdulhayoğlu organized the Common Computing Security Standards Forum initially for the purpose of maintaining a list of legitimate antivirus engines.

This was in response to "scareware" products that present themselves as antivirus software but are either adware or malware. According to the FBI, they are aware of an estimated loss to victims from rogue antivirus software of as much as $150 million.

== Whitelist ==
The CCSS maintains a so-called "whitelist" of legitimate organizations that provide antivirus systems. The "Trusted Vendors" list can be viewed on the organization's web site, http://www.ccssforum.org
