= Code signing =

Software authentication

Code signing is the process of digitally signing executables and scripts to confirm the software author and guarantee that the code has not been altered or corrupted since it was signed. The process employs the use of a cryptographic hash to validate authenticity and integrity.

Code signing can provide several valuable features. The most common use of code signing is to provide security when deploying; in some programming languages, it can also be used to help prevent namespace conflicts. Almost every code signing implementation will provide some sort of digital signature mechanism to verify the identity of the author or build system, and a checksum to verify that the object has not been modified. It can also be used to provide versioning information about an object or to store other metadata about an object.

The efficacy of code signing as an authentication mechanism for software depends on the security of underpinning signing keys. As with other public key infrastructure (PKI) technologies, the integrity of the system relies on publishers securing their private keys against unauthorized access. Keys stored in software on general-purpose computers are susceptible to compromise. Therefore, it is more secure, and best practice, to store keys in secure, tamper-proof, cryptographic hardware devices known as hardware security modules or HSMs.

Code signing was invented in 1995 by Michael Doyle, as part of the Eolas WebWish browser plug-in, which enabled the use of public-key cryptography to sign downloadable Web app program code using a secret key, so the plug-in code interpreter could then use the corresponding public key to authenticate the code before allowing it access to the code interpreter's APIs.

== Providing security ==
Many code signing implementations will provide a way to sign the code using a system involving a pair of keys, one public and one private, similar to the process employed by TLS or SSH. For example, in the case of .NET, the developer uses a private key to sign their libraries or executables each time they build. This key will be unique to a developer or group or sometimes per application or object. The developer can either generate this key on their own or obtain one from a trusted certificate authority (CA).

Code signing is particularly valuable in distributed environments, where the source of a given piece of code may not be immediately evident - for example Java applets, ActiveX controls and other active web and browser scripting code. Another important usage is to safely provide updates and patches to existing software. Windows, Mac OS X, and most Linux distributions provide updates using code signing to ensure that it is not possible for others to maliciously distribute code via the patch system. It allows the receiving operating system to verify that the update is legitimate, even if the update was delivered by third parties or physical media (disks).

Code signing is used on Windows and Mac OS X to authenticate software on first run, ensuring that the software has not been maliciously tampered with by a third-party distributor or download site. This form of code signing is not used on Linux because of that platform's decentralized nature, the package manager being the predominant mode of distribution for all forms of software (not just updates and patches), as well as the open-source model allowing direct inspection of the source code if desired. Debian-based Linux distributions (among others) validate downloaded packages using public key cryptography.

=== Trusted identification using a certificate authority (CA) ===
The public key used to authenticate the code signature should be traceable back to a trusted root authority CA, preferably using a secure public key infrastructure (PKI). This does not ensure that the code itself can be trusted, only that it comes from the stated source (or more explicitly, from a particular private key). A CA provides a root trust level and is able to assign trust to others by proxy. If a user trusts a CA, then the user can presumably trust the legitimacy of code that is signed with a key generated by that CA or one of its proxies. Many operating systems and frameworks contain built-in trust for one or more certification authorities. It is also commonplace for large organizations to implement a private CA, internal to the organization, which provides the same features as public CAs, but it is only trusted within the organization.

=== Extended validation (EV) code signing ===
Extended validation (EV) code signing certificates are subject to additional validation and technical requirements. These guidelines are based on the CA/B Forum's Baseline Requirements and Extended Validation Guidelines. In addition to validation requirements specific to EV, the EV code signing guidelines stipulate that "the Subscriber's private key is generated, stored and used in a crypto module that meets or exceeds the requirements of FIPS 140-2 level 2."

Certain applications, such as signing Windows 10 kernel-mode drivers, require an EV code signing certificate. Additionally, Microsoft's IEBlog states that Windows programs "signed by an EV code signing certificate can immediately establish reputation with SmartScreen reputation services even if no prior reputation exists for that file or publisher."

==== Sample EV code signing certificate ====
This is an example of a decoded EV code signing certificate used by SSL.com to sign software. SSL.com EV Code Signing Intermediate CA RSA R3 is shown as the Issuer's commonName, identifying this as an EV code signing certificate. The certificate's Subject field describes SSL Corp as an organization. Code Signing is shown as the sole X509v3 Extended Key Usage.

Certificate:
    Data:
        Version: 3 (0x2)
        Serial Number:
            59:4e:2d:88:5a:2c:b0:1a:5e:d6:4c:7b:df:35:59:7d
    Signature Algorithm: sha256WithRSAEncryption
        Issuer:
            commonName                = SSL.com EV Code Signing Intermediate CA RSA R3
            organizationName          = SSL Corp
            localityName              = Houston
            stateOrProvinceName       = Texas
            countryName               = US
        Validity
            Not Before: Aug 30 20:29:13 2019 GMT
            Not After : Nov 12 20:29:13 2022 GMT
        Subject:
            1.3.6.1.4.1.311.60.2.1.3 = US
            1.3.6.1.4.1.311.60.2.1.2 = Nevada
            streetAddress             = 3100 Richmond Ave Ste 503
            businessCategory          = Private Organization
            postalCode                = 77098
            commonName                = SSL Corp
            serialNumber              = NV20081614243
            organizationName          = SSL Corp
            localityName              = Houston
            stateOrProvinceName       = Texas
            countryName               = US
        Subject Public Key Info:
            Public Key Algorithm: rsaEncryption
                Public-Key: (2048 bit)
                Modulus:
                    00:c3:e9:ae:be:d7:a2:6f:2f:24 ...
                Exponent: 65537 (0x10001)
        X509v3 extensions:
            X509v3 Authority Key Identifier: 
                keyid:36:BD:49:FF:31:2C:EB:AF:6A:40:FE:99:C0:16:ED:BA:FC:48:DD:5F
                
            Authority Information Access: 
                CA Issuers - URI:http://www.ssl.com/repository/SSLcom-SubCA-EV-CodeSigning-RSA-4096-R3.crt
                OCSP - URI:http://ocsps.ssl.com
                
            X509v3 Certificate Policies: 
                Policy: 2.23.140.1.3
                Policy: 1.2.616.1.113527.2.5.1.7
                Policy: 1.3.6.1.4.1.38064.1.3.3.2
                  CPS: https://www.ssl.com/repository
                  
            X509v3 Extended Key Usage: 
                Code Signing
            X509v3 CRL Distribution Points: 
            
                Full Name:
                  URI:http://crls.ssl.com/SSLcom-SubCA-EV-CodeSigning-RSA-4096-R3.crl
                  
            X509v3 Subject Key Identifier: 
                EC:6A:64:06:26:A7:7A:69:E8:CC:06:D5:6F:FA:E1:C2:9A:29:79:DE
            X509v3 Key Usage: critical
                Digital Signature
    Signature Algorithm: sha256WithRSAEncryption
         17:d7:a1:26:58:31:14:2b:9f:3b ...

=== Alternative to CAs ===
The other model is the trust on first use model, in which developers can choose to provide their own self-generated key. In this scenario, the user would normally have to obtain the public key in some fashion directly from the developer to verify the object is from them for the first time. Many code signing systems will store the public key inside the signature. Some software frameworks and OSs that check the code's signature before executing will allow you to choose to trust that developer from that point on after the first run. An application developer can provide a similar system by including the public keys with the installer. The key can then be used to ensure that any subsequent objects that need to run, such as upgrades, plugins, or another application, are all verified as coming from that same developer.

=== Time-stamping ===
Time-stamping was designed to circumvent the trust warning that will appear in the case of an expired certificate. In effect, time-stamping extends the code trust beyond the validity period of a certificate.

In the event that a certificate has to be revoked due to a compromise, a specific date and time of the compromising event will become part of the revocation record. In this case, time-stamping helps establish whether the code was signed before or after the certificate was compromised.

=== Code signing in Xcode ===
Developers need to sign their iOS and tvOS apps before running them on any real device and before uploading them to the App Store. This is needed to prove that the developer owns a valid Apple Developer ID. An application needs a valid profile or certificate so that it can run on the devices.

=== Problems ===
Like any security measure, code signing can be defeated. Users can be tricked into running unsigned code, or even into running code that refuses to validate, and the system only remains secure as long as the private key remains private.

It is also important to note that code signing does not protect the end user from any malicious activity or unintentional software bugs by the software author — it merely ensures that the software has not been modified by anyone other than the author. Sometimes, sandbox systems do not accept certificates, because of a false time-stamp or because of an excess usage of RAM.

== Implementations ==
Microsoft implements a form of code signing (based on Authenticode) provided for Microsoft tested drivers. Since drivers run in the kernel, they can destabilize the system or open the system to security holes. For this reason, Microsoft tests drivers submitted to its WHQL program. After the driver has passed, Microsoft signs that version of the driver as being safe. On 32-bit systems only, installing drivers that are not validated with Microsoft is possible after agreeing to allow the installation at a prompt warning the user that the code is unsigned. For .NET (managed) code, there is an additional mechanism called Strong Name Signing that uses Public/Private keys and SHA-1 hash as opposed to certificates. However, Microsoft discourages reliance on Strong Name Signing as a replacement for Authenticode.

The Code Signing Working Group of the CA/Browser Forum decided that starting June 1, 2023, all code signing certificates (not only the EA ones) should mandate private key storage on a physical media, such as in a hardware crypto module conforming to at least FIPS 140-2 Level 2 or Common Criteria EAL 4+. The CAs subsequently issued announcements on compliance with the decision.

== Unsigned code in gaming and consumer devices ==
In the context of consumer devices such as games consoles, the term "unsigned code" is often used to refer to an application which has not been signed with the cryptographic key normally required for software to be accepted and executed. Most console games have to be signed with a secret key designed by the console maker or the game will not load on the console (both to enforce Vendor lock-in and combat software piracy). There are several methods to get unsigned code to execute which include software exploits, the use of a modchip, a technique known as the swap trick or running a softmod.

It may not initially seem obvious why simply copying a signed application onto another DVD does not allow it to boot. On the Xbox, the reason for this is that the Xbox executable file (XBE) contains a media-type flag, which specifies the type of media that the XBE is bootable from. On nearly all Xbox software, this is set such that the executable will only boot from factory-produced discs, so simply copying the executable to burnable media is enough to stop the execution of the software.

However, since the executable is signed, simply changing the value of the flag is not possible as this alters the signature of the executable, causing it to fail validation when checked.

== See also ==
- Digital signature
- iOS jailbreaking
- PlayStation Portable homebrew
- Privilege escalation
- Rooting (Android OS)
- Symbian OS Security bypass
