= Entrust =

American digital security company

Entrust Corporation
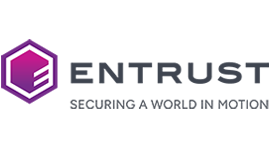
- Formerly: Entrust Datacard
- Type: Private
- Industry: Information security; Identity and access management (IAM); Public key infrastructure; Digital identity; Cryptography
- Founded: 1969
- Headquarters: Shakopee, Minnesota, U.S.
- Area served: Worldwide
- Key people: Tony Ball (CEO)
- Revenue: 916,700,000 United States dollar (2024)
- Total assets: 1,325,500,000 United States dollar (2024)
- Number of employees: 3,000 (16 July 2025)
- Website: www.entrust.com

Entrust Corporation is an American digital security company headquartered in Shakopee, Minnesota. The company develops hardware and software for card and ID issuance, identity verification, authentication, certificate and key lifecycle management, and post-quantum cryptography. The business traces its roots to Datacard Corporation (founded in 1969) and Entrust Inc. (founded in 1994). Datacard acquired Entrust in 2013, and the combined company rebranded as Entrust in 2020.

Entrust operated a publicly trusted certificate authority until selling its public certificate business to Sectigo in January 2025. Notable acquisitions include nCipher (2019), HyTrust (2021), WorldReach (2021), and Onfido (2024). In July 2025, Entrust named Tony Ball as incoming chief executive officer (CEO) to succeed Todd Wilkinson, effective March 31, 2026.

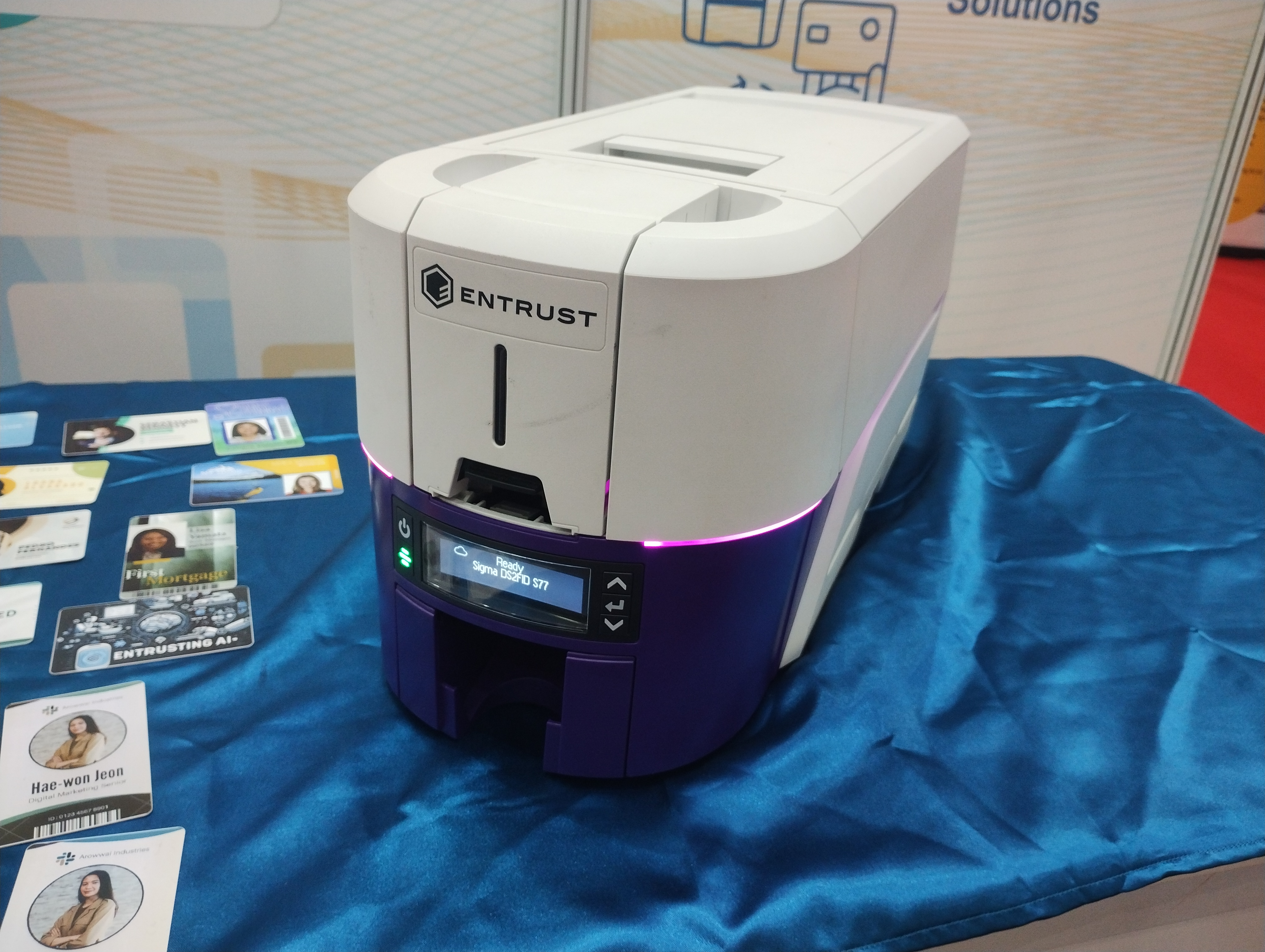
Entrust Sigma DS2 printer at 8th Print and Pack Tech Expo, Bangalore (2025)

== History ==
=== Datacard Corporation (1969-2013) ===
Datacard Corporation was founded in 1969 by Willis K. Drake. Early operations focused on systems that enabled banks and retailers to produce plastic payment cards more quickly, later expanding to secure the personalization of ID and passports. It was publicly traded before being acquired in 1987 by the family investment office of Germany’s Quandt family, which retains long-term ownership.

In April 2000, Datacard acquired Platform Seven (P7), a smart‑card technology unit created by National Westminster Bank (NatWest).

In 2013, Datacard acquired Entrust Inc. from Thoma Bravo. A year later, the combined company adopted the name Entrust Datacard.

=== Entrust Technologies Inc. (1994-2013) ===
Entrust’s public key infrastructure (PKI) software was first released in January 1994 within Northern Telecom’s (Nortel) “Secure Networks” group, which Nortel created to develop and sell PKI products.

In December 1996, Nortel spun off its Secure Networks group as a separate company, Entrust Technologies Inc., to continue to develop and sell PKI software while retaining a majority stake in the new firm.

The company acquired enCommerce, an authentication and authorization software vendor, in April 2000 for a reported $470–$586 million.

In 2004, Entrust acquired content‑scanning and compliance technology from Ottawa‑based AmikaNow!.

Orion Security Solutions, a PKI services provider, was purchased in June 2006 for a reported $8 million. The following month, it acquired Business Signatures Corporation, a California‑based fraud‑detection software firm, for $50 million in cash.

Entrust was taken private by Thoma Bravo in July 2009.

=== Entrust Datacard (2013-2019) ===
Datacard Group acquired Entrust in 2013; the combined company rebranded as Entrust Datacard in 2014.

In February 2019, Entrust Datacard purchased Thales’s general‑purpose hardware security module (HSM) business, nCipher Security; the divestiture was required by the European Commission as a condition of approving Thales’s acquisition of Gemalto.

=== Entrust Corporation (2020-present) ===
On September 14, 2020, the company rebranded from Entrust Datacard to Entrust and changed its legal entity name to Entrust Corporation.

In April 2021, Entrust acquired Ottawa‑based WorldReach Software, which developed digital identity and travel‑document solutions for governments and border programs.

Entrust completed the acquisition of UK identity‑verification firm Onfido in April 2024.

On June 27, 2024, the Google Chrome Security Team and Chrome Root Program announced that Chrome would stop trusting newly issued TLS server certificates chaining to Entrust and its AffirmTrust roots. After an update to align enforcement with a major release, the change began in Chrome 131 on November 12, 2024, and applied to certificates whose earliest Signed Certificate Timestamp (SCT) was dated after November 11, 2024, 11:59:59 PM UTC; previously issued certificates were not affected by default trust changes.

On July 31, 2024, Ben Wilson, Mozilla’s Root Store Manager, announced that Mozilla would set a distrust-after date of November 30, 2024, for TLS certificates chaining to Entrust and AffirmTrust roots, meaning Firefox would not trust certificates issued after that date; earlier issuance would remain unaffected.

Following the sale to Sectigo in January 2025, Sectigo completed Entrust public certificate customer migration to its platform on September 29, 2025. Entrust continues to offer private and managed PKI and software.

On January 29, 2025, Entrust sold its public certificate authority business to Sectigo.

In July 2025, Entrust announced that Tony Ball would succeed Todd Wilkinson as CEO, with the transition effective March 31, 2026.
