= Extended Validation Certificate =

X.509 public key certificate

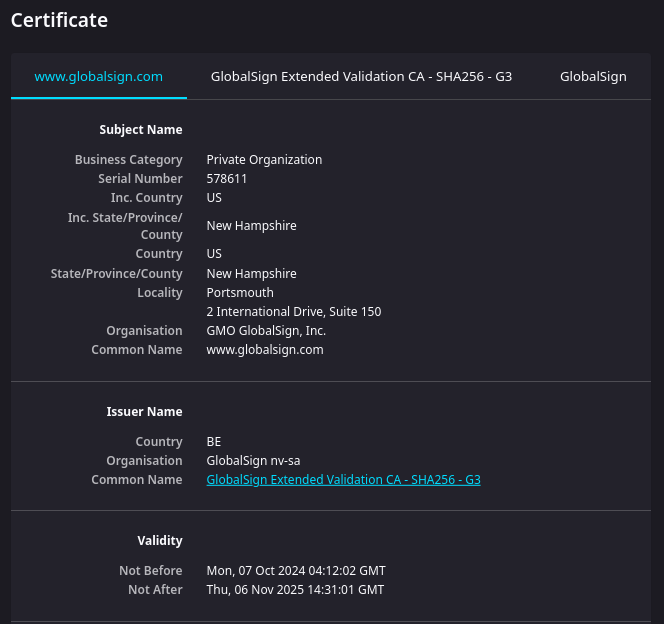
An example of Extended Validation Certificate, issued by GlobalSign

An Extended Validation (EV) Certificate is a certificate conforming to X.509 that proves the legal entity of the owner and is signed by a certificate authority key that can issue EV certificates. EV certificates can be used in the same manner as any other X.509 certificates, including securing web communications with HTTPS and signing software and documents. Unlike domain-validated certificates and organization-validation certificates, EV certificates can be issued only by a subset of certificate authorities (CAs) and require verification of the requesting entity's legal identity before certificate issuance.

As of February 2021, all major web browsers (Google Chrome, Mozilla Firefox, Microsoft Edge and Apple Safari) have menus which show the EV status of the certificate and the verified legal identity of EV certificates. Mobile browsers typically display EV certificates the same way they do Domain Validation (DV) and Organization Validation (OV) certificates. Of the ten most popular websites online, none use EV certificates and the trend is away from their usage.

For software, the verified legal identity is displayed to the user by the operating system (e.g., Microsoft Windows) before proceeding with the installation.

Extended Validation certificates are stored in a file format specified by and typically use the same encryption as organization-validated certificates and domain-validated certificates, so they are compatible with most server and user agent software.

The criteria for issuing EV certificates are defined by the Guidelines for Extended Validation established by the CA/Browser Forum.

To issue an extended validation certificate, a CA requires verification of the requesting entity's identity and its operational status with its control over domain name and hosting server.

== History ==
=== Introduction by CA/Browser Forum ===
In 2005 Melih Abdulhayoglu, CEO of the Comodo Group (currently known as Xcitium), convened the first meeting of the organization that became the CA/Browser Forum, hoping to improve standards for issuing SSL/TLS certificates. On June 12, 2007, the CA/Browser Forum officially ratified the first version of the Extended Validation (EV) SSL Guidelines, which took effect immediately. The formal approval successfully brought to a close more than two years of effort and provided the infrastructure for trusted website identity on the Internet. Then, in April 2008, the forum announced version 1.1 of the guidelines, building on the practical experience of its member CAs and relying-party application software suppliers gained in the months since the first version was approved for use.

=== Creation of special UI indicators in browsers ===
Most major browsers created special user interface indicators for pages loaded via HTTPS secured by an EV certificate soon after the creation of the standard. This includes Google Chrome 1.0, Internet Explorer 7.0, Firefox 3, Safari 3.2, Opera 9.5. Furthermore, some mobile browsers, including Safari for iOS, Windows Phone, Firefox for Android, Chrome for Android, and iOS, added such UI indicators. Usually, browsers with EV support display the validated identity—usually a combination of organization name and jurisdiction—contained in the EV certificate's 'subject' field.

In most implementations, the enhanced display includes:

- The name of the company or entity that owns the certificate;
- A lock symbol, also in the address bar, that varies in color depending on the security status of the website.

By clicking on the lock symbol, the user can obtain more information about the certificate, including the name of the certificate authority that issued the EV certificate.

=== Removal of special UI indicators ===
In May 2018, Google announced plans to redesign user interfaces of Google Chrome to remove emphasis for EV certificates. Chrome 77, released in 2019, removed the EV certificate indication from the omnibox, but EV certificate status can be viewed by clicking on lock icon and then checking for legal entity name listed as "issued to" under "certificate". Firefox 70 removed the distinction in the omnibox or URL bar (EV and DV certificates are displayed similarly with just a lock icon), but the details about certificate EV status are accessible in the more detailed view that opens after clicking on the lock icon.

Apple Safari on iOS 12 and MacOS Mojave (released in September 2018) removed the visual distinction of EV status.

== Issuing criteria ==
Only CAs who pass an independent qualified audit review may offer EV, and all CAs globally must follow the same detailed issuance requirements which aim to:

- Establish the legal identity as well as the operational and physical presence of website owner;
- Establish that the applicant is the domain name owner or has exclusive control over the domain name;
- Confirm the identity and authority of the individuals acting for the website owner, and that documents pertaining to legal obligations are signed by an authorized officer;
- Limit the duration of certificate validity to ensure the certificate information is up to date. CA/B Forum is also limiting the maximum re-use of domain validation data and organization data to maximum of 397 days (must not exceed 398 days) from March 2020 onward.

With the exception of Extended Validation Certificates for .onion domains, it is otherwise not possible to get a wildcard Extended Validation Certificate – instead, all fully qualified domain names must be included in the certificate and inspected by the certificate authority.

== Extended Validation certificate identification ==
EV certificates are standard X.509 digital certificates. The primary way to identify an EV certificate is by referencing the Certificate Policies (CP) extension field. Each EV certificate's CP object identifier (OID) field identifies an EV certificate. The CA/Browser Forum's EV OID is 2.23.140.1.1. Other EV OIDs may be documented in the issuer's Certification Practice Statement. As with root certificate authorities in general, browsers may not recognize all issuers.

EV HTTPS certificates contain a subject with X.509 OIDs for jurisdictionOfIncorporationCountryName (OID: 1.3.6.1.4.1.311.60.2.1.3), jurisdictionOfIncorporationStateOrProvinceName (OID: 1.3.6.1.4.1.311.60.2.1.2) (optional),jurisdictionLocalityName (OID: 1.3.6.1.4.1.311.60.2.1.1) (optional), businessCategory (OID: 2.5.4.15) and serialNumber (OID: 2.5.4.5), with the serialNumber pointing to the ID at the relevant secretary of state (US) or government business registrar (outside US).

== Online Certificate Status Protocol ==
The criteria for issuing Extended Validation certificates do not require issuing certificate authorities to immediately support Online Certificate Status Protocol for revocation checking. However, the requirement for a timely response to revocation checks by the browser has prompted most certificate authorities that had not previously done so to implement OCSP support. Section 26-A of the issuing criteria requires CAs to support OCSP checking for all certificates issued after Dec. 31, 2010.

== Criticism ==
=== Colliding entity names ===
The legal entity names are not unique, therefore an attacker who wants to impersonate an entity might incorporate a different business with the same name (but, e.g., in a different state or country) and obtain a valid certificate for it, but then use the certificate to impersonate the original site. In one demonstration, a researcher incorporated a business called "Stripe, Inc." in Kentucky and showed that browsers display it similarly to how they display certificate of payment processor "Stripe, Inc." incorporated in Delaware. Researcher claimed the demonstration setup took about an hour of his time, US$100 in legal costs and US$77 for the certificate. Also, he noted that "with enough mouse clicks, [user] may be able to [view] the city and state [where entity is incorporated], but neither of these are helpful to a typical user, and they will likely just blindly trust the [EV certificate] indicator".

=== Availability to small businesses ===
Since EV certificates are being promoted and reported as a mark of a trustworthy website, some small business owners have voiced concerns that EV certificates give undue advantage to large businesses. The published drafts of the EV Guidelines excluded unincorporated business entities, and early media reports focused on that issue. Version 1.0 of the EV Guidelines was revised to embrace unincorporated associations as long as they were registered with a recognized agency, greatly expanding the number of organizations that qualified for an Extended Validation Certificate.

=== Effectiveness against phishing attacks with IE7 security UI ===
In 2006, researchers at Stanford University and Microsoft Research conducted a usability study of the EV display in Internet Explorer 7. Their paper concluded that "participants who received no training in browser security features did not notice the extended validation indicator and did not outperform the control group", whereas "participants who were asked to read the Internet Explorer help file were more likely to classify both real and fake sites as legitimate".

=== Domain-validated certificates were created by CAs in the first place ===
While proponents of EV certificates claim they help against phishing attacks, security expert Peter Gutmann states the new class of certificates restore a CA's profits which were eroded due to the race to the bottom that occurred among issuers in the industry. According to Peter Gutmann, EV certificates are not effective against phishing because EV certificates are "not fixing any problem that the phishers are exploiting". He suggests that the big commercial CAs have introduced EV certificates to return the old high prices.

== See also ==
- Qualified website authentication certificate
- HTTP Strict Transport Security
