= Certificate authority =

Entity that issues digital certificates

In cryptography, a certificate authority or certification authority (CA) is an entity that stores, signs, and issues digital certificates. A digital certificate certifies the ownership of a public key by the named subject of the certificate. This allows others (relying parties) to rely upon signatures or on assertions made about the private key that corresponds to the certified public key. A CA acts as a trusted third party—trusted both by the subject (owner) of the certificate and by the party relying upon the certificate. The format of these certificates is specified by the X.509 or EMV standard.

One particularly common use for certificate authorities is to sign certificates used in HTTPS, the secure browsing protocol for the World Wide Web. Another common use is in issuing identity cards by national governments for use in electronically signing documents.

== Overview ==
Trusted certificates can be used to create secure connections to a server via the Internet. A certificate is essential in order to circumvent a malicious party which happens to be on the route to a target server which acts as if it were the target. Such a scenario is commonly referred to as a man-in-the-middle attack. The client uses the CA certificate to authenticate the CA signature on the server certificate, as part of the authorizations before launching a secure connection. Usually, client software—for example, browsers—include a set of trusted CA certificates. This makes sense, as many users need to trust their client software. A malicious or compromised client can skip any security check and still fool its users into believing otherwise.

The clients of a CA are server supervisors who call for a certificate that their servers will bestow to users. Commercial CAs charge money to issue certificates, and their customers anticipate the CA's certificate to be contained within the majority of web browsers, so that safe connections to the certified servers work efficiently out-of-the-box. The quantity of web browsers, other devices, and applications which trust a particular certificate authority is referred to as ubiquity. Mozilla, which is a non-profit business, issues several commercial CA certificates with its products. While Mozilla developed their own policy, the CA/Browser Forum developed similar guidelines for CA trust. A single CA certificate may be shared among multiple CAs or their resellers. A root CA certificate may be the base to issue multiple intermediate CA certificates with varying validation requirements.

In addition to commercial CAs, some non-profits issue publicly-trusted digital certificates without charge, for example Let's Encrypt. Some large cloud computing and web hosting companies are also publicly-trusted CAs and issue certificates to services hosted on their infrastructure, for example IBM Cloud, Amazon Web Services, Cloudflare, and Google Cloud Platform.

Large organizations or government bodies may have their own PKIs (public key infrastructure), each containing their own CAs. Any site using self-signed certificates acts as its own CA.

Commercial banks that issue EMV payment cards are governed by the EMV Certificate Authority, payment schemes that route payment transactions initiated at Point of Sale Terminals (POS) to a Card Issuing Bank to transfer the funds from the card holder's bank account to the payment recipient's bank account. Each payment card presents along with its card data also the Card Issuer Certificate to the POS. The Issuer Certificate is signed by EMV CA Certificate. The POS retrieves the public key of EMV CA from its storage, validates the Issuer Certificate and authenticity of the payment card before sending the payment request to the payment scheme.

Browsers and other clients of sorts characteristically allow users to add or do away with CA certificates at will. While server certificates regularly last for a relatively short period, CA certificates are further extended, so, for repeatedly visited servers, it is less error-prone importing and trusting the CA issued, rather than confirm a security exemption each time the server's certificate is renewed.

Less often, trustworthy certificates are used for encrypting or signing messages. CAs dispense end-user certificates too, which can be used with S/MIME. However, encryption entails the receiver's public key and, since authors and receivers of encrypted messages, apparently, know one another, the usefulness of a trusted third party remains confined to the signature verification of messages sent to public mailing lists.

== Providers ==
Worldwide, the certificate authority business is fragmented, with national or regional providers dominating their home market. This is because many uses of digital certificates, such as for legally binding digital signatures, are linked to local law, regulations, and accreditation schemes for certificate authorities.

However, the market for globally trusted TLS/SSL server certificates is largely held by a small number of multinational companies. This market has significant barriers to entry due to the technical requirements. While not legally required, new providers may choose to undergo annual security audits (such as WebTrust for certificate authorities in North America and ETSI in Europe) to be included as a trusted root by a web browser or operating system.

As of 24 August 2020, 147 root certificates, representing 52 organizations, are trusted in the Mozilla Firefox web browser, 168 root certificates, representing 60 organizations, are trusted by macOS, and 255 root certificates, representing 101 organizations, are trusted by Microsoft Windows. As of Android 4.2 (Jelly Bean), Android currently contains over 100 CAs that are updated with each release.

On November 18, 2014, a group of companies and nonprofit organizations, including the Electronic Frontier Foundation, Mozilla, Cisco, and Akamai, announced Let's Encrypt, a nonprofit certificate authority that provides free domain validated X.509 certificates as well as software to enable installation and maintenance of certificates. Let's Encrypt is operated by the Internet Security Research Group, a California nonprofit recognized as federally tax-exempt.

According to Netcraft in May 2015, the industry standard for monitoring active TLS certificates, "Although the global [TLS] ecosystem is competitive, it is dominated by a handful of major CAs — three certificate authorities (Symantec, Comodo CA, GoDaddy) account for three-quarters of all issued [TLS] certificates on public-facing web servers. The top spot has been held by Symantec (or VeriSign before it was purchased by Symantec) ever since [our] survey began, with it currently accounting for just under a third of all certificates. To illustrate the effect of differing methodologies, amongst the million busiest sites Symantec issued 44% of the valid, trusted certificates in use — significantly more than its overall market share."

As of July 2024 the survey company W3Techs, which collects statistics on certificate authority usage among the Alexa top 10 million and the Tranco top 1 million websites, lists the five largest authorities by absolute usage share as below.

| Rank | Issuer | Usage | Market Share |
|---|---|---|---|
| 1 | Let's Encrypt | 60.6% | 64.1% |
| 2 | GlobalSign | 22.3% | 23.6% |
| 3 | Sectigo (formerly known as Comodo CA) | 5.7% | 6.0% |
| 4 | GoDaddy Group | 3.7% | 3.9% |
| 5 | DigiCert Group | 1.8% | 1.9% |

== Validation standards ==
The commercial CAs that issue the bulk of certificates for HTTPS servers typically use a technique called "domain validation" to authenticate the recipient of the certificate. The techniques used for domain validation vary between CAs, but in general domain validation techniques are meant to prove that the certificate applicant controls a given domain name, not any information about the applicant's identity.

Many Certificate Authorities also offer Extended Validation (EV) certificates as a more rigorous alternative to domain validated certificates. Extended validation is intended to verify not only control of a domain name, but additional identity information to be included in the certificate. Some browsers display this additional identity information in a green box in the URL bar. One limitation of EV as a solution to the weaknesses of domain validation is that attackers could still obtain a domain validated certificate for the victim domain, and deploy it during an attack; if that occurred, the difference observable to the victim user would be the absence of a green bar with the company name. There is some question whether users would be likely to recognize this absence as indicative of an attack being in progress: a test using Internet Explorer 7 in 2009 showed that the absence of IE7's EV warnings were not noticed by users, however Microsoft's newer browser, Edge Legacy, shows a significantly greater difference between EV and domain validated certificates, with domain validated certificates having a hollow, gray lock.

== Validation weaknesses ==
Domain validation suffers from certain structural security limitations. In particular, it is always vulnerable to attacks that allow an adversary to observe the domain validation probes that CAs send. These can include attacks against the DNS, TCP, or BGP protocols (which lack the cryptographic protections of TLS/SSL), or the compromise of routers. Such attacks are possible either on the network near a CA, or near the victim domain itself.

One of the most common domain validation techniques involves sending an email containing an authentication token or link to an email address that is likely to be administratively responsible for the domain. This could be the technical contact email address listed in the domain's WHOIS entry, or an administrative email like admin@, administrator@, webmaster@, hostmaster@ or postmaster@ the domain. Some Certificate Authorities may accept confirmation using root@, info@, or support@ in the domain. The theory behind domain validation is that only the legitimate owner of a domain would be able to read emails sent to these administrative addresses.

Domain validation implementations have sometimes been a source of security vulnerabilities. In one instance, security researchers showed that attackers could obtain certificates for webmail sites because a CA was willing to use an email address like ssladmin@domain.com for domain.com, but not all webmail systems had reserved the "ssladmin" username to prevent attackers from registering it.

Prior to 2011, there was no standard list of email addresses that could be used for domain validation, so it was not clear to email administrators which addresses needed to be reserved. The first version of the CA/Browser Forum Baseline Requirements, adopted November 2011, specified a list of such addresses. This allowed mail hosts to reserve those addresses for administrative use, though such precautions are still not universal. In January 2015, a Finnish man registered the username "hostmaster" at the Finnish version of Microsoft Live and was able to obtain a domain-validated certificate for live.fi, despite not being the owner of the domain name.

== Issuing a certificate ==
The procedure of obtaining a public key certificate

A CA issues digital certificates that contain a public key and the identity of the owner. The matching private key is not made available publicly, but kept secret by the end user who generated the key pair. The certificate is also a confirmation or validation by the CA that the public key contained in the certificate belongs to the person, organization, server or other entity noted in the certificate. A CA's obligation in such schemes is to verify an applicant's credentials, so that users and relying parties can trust the information in the issued certificate. CAs use a variety of standards and tests to do so. In essence, the certificate authority is responsible for saying "yes, this person is who they say they are, and we, the CA, certify that".

If the user trusts the CA and can verify the CA's signature, then they can also assume that a certain public key does indeed belong to whoever is identified in the certificate.

=== Example ===
Public-key cryptography can be used to encrypt data communicated between two parties. This can typically happen when a user logs on to any site that implements the HTTP Secure protocol. In this example let us suppose that the user logs on to their bank's homepage www.bank.example to do online banking. When the user opens www.bank.example homepage, they receive a public key along with all the data that their web-browser displays. The public key could be used to encrypt data from the client to the server but the safe procedure is to use it in a protocol that determines a temporary shared symmetric encryption key; messages in such a key exchange protocol can be enciphered with the bank's public key in such a way that only the bank server has the private key to read them.

The rest of the communication then proceeds using the new (disposable) symmetric key, so when the user enters some information to the bank's page and submits the page (sends the information back to the bank) then the data the user has entered to the page will be encrypted by their web browser. Therefore, even if someone can access the (encrypted) data that was communicated from the user to www.bank.example, such eavesdropper cannot read or decipher it.

This mechanism is only safe if the user can be sure that it is the bank that they see in their web browser. If the user types in www.bank.example, but their communication is hijacked and a fake website (that pretends to be the bank website) sends the page information back to the user's browser, the fake web-page can send a fake public key to the user (for which the fake site owns a matching private key). The user will fill the form with their personal data and will submit the page. The fake web-page will then get access to the user's data.

This is what the certificate authority mechanism is intended to prevent. A certificate authority (CA) is an organization that stores public keys and their owners, and every party in a communication trusts this organization (and knows its public key). When the user's web browser receives the public key from www.bank.example it also receives a digital signature of the key (with some more information, in a so-called X.509 certificate). The browser already possesses the public key of the CA and consequently can verify the signature, trust the certificate and the public key in it: since www.bank.example uses a public key that the certification authority certifies, a fake www.bank.example can only use the same public key. Since the fake www.bank.example does not know the corresponding private key, it cannot create the signature needed to verify its authenticity.

=== Security ===
It is difficult to assure correctness of match between data and entity when the data are presented to the CA (perhaps over an electronic network), and when the credentials of the person/company/program asking for a certificate are likewise presented. This is why commercial CAs often use a combination of authentication techniques including leveraging government bureaus, the payment infrastructure, third parties' databases and services, and custom heuristics. In some enterprise systems, local forms of authentication such as Kerberos can be used to obtain a certificate which can in turn be used by external relying parties. Notaries are required in some cases to personally know the party whose signature is being notarized; this is a higher standard than is reached by many CAs. According to the American Bar Association outline on Online Transaction Management the primary points of US Federal and State statutes enacted regarding digital signatures has been to "prevent conflicting and overly burdensome local regulation and to establish that electronic writings satisfy the traditional requirements associated with paper documents." Further the US E-Sign statute and the suggested UETA code help ensure that:

1. a signature, contract or other record relating to such transaction may not be denied legal effect, validity, or enforceability solely because it is in electronic form; and
2. a contract relating to such transaction may not be denied legal effect, validity or enforceability solely because an electronic signature or electronic record was used in its formation.

Despite the security measures undertaken to correctly verify the identities of people and companies, there is a risk of a single CA issuing a bogus certificate to an imposter. It is also possible to register individuals and companies with the same or very similar names, which may lead to confusion. To minimize this hazard, the certificate transparency initiative proposes auditing all certificates in a public unforgeable log, which could help in the prevention of phishing.

In large-scale deployments, Alice may not be familiar with Bob's certificate authority (perhaps they each have a different CA server), so Bob's certificate may also include his CA's public key signed by a different CA_{2}, which is presumably recognizable by Alice. This process typically leads to a hierarchy or mesh of CAs and CA certificates.

=== Certificate revocation ===
A certificate may be revoked before it expires, which signals that it is no longer valid. Without revocation, an attacker would be able to exploit such a compromised or misissued certificate until expiry. Hence, revocation is an important part of a public key infrastructure. Revocation is performed by the issuing CA, which produces a cryptographically authenticated statement of revocation.

For distributing revocation information to clients, timeliness of the discovery of revocation (and hence the window for an attacker to exploit a compromised certificate) trades off against resource usage in querying revocation statuses and privacy concerns. If revocation information is unavailable (either due to accident or an attack), clients must decide whether to fail-hard and treat a certificate as if it is revoked (and so degrade availability) or to fail-soft and treat it as unrevoked (and allow attackers to sidestep revocation).

Due to the cost of revocation checks and the availability impact from potentially-unreliable remote services, Web browsers limit the revocation checks they will perform, and will fail-soft where they do. Certificate revocation lists are too bandwidth-costly for routine use, and the Online Certificate Status Protocol presents connection latency and privacy issues. Other schemes have been proposed but have not yet been successfully deployed to enable fail-hard checking.

== Industry organizations ==
- Certificate Authority Security Council (CASC) – In February 2013, the CASC was founded as an industry advocacy organization dedicated to addressing industry issues and educating the public on internet security. The founding members are the seven largest Certificate Authorities.
- Common Computing Security Standards Forum (CCSF) – In 2009 the CCSF was founded to promote industry standards that protect end users. Comodo Group CEO Melih Abdulhayoğlu is considered the founder of the CCSF.
- CA/Browser Forum – In 2005, a new consortium of Certificate Authorities and web browser vendors was formed to promote industry standards and baseline requirements for internet security. Abdulhayoğlu organized the first meeting and is considered the founder of the CA/Browser Forum.

=== Baseline requirements ===
The CA/Browser Forum publishes the Baseline Requirements, a list of policies and technical requirements for CAs to follow. These are a requirement for inclusion in the certificate stores of Firefox and Safari.

On April 14, 2025, the CA/Browser Forum passed a ballot to reduce SSL/TLS certificates to 47 day maximum term by March 15, 2029.

| Start date | Max Lifetime | Introduced in | Certificate Renewal Cadence |
|---|---|---|---|
| 1st July 2012 | 60 Months | v1.0 of the Baseline Requirements. §9.4 | |
| 1st April 2015 | 39 Months | v1.3.0 of the Baseline Requirements. §6.3.2 | |
| 1 March 2018 | 825 Days | v1.4.4 of the Baseline Requirements. §6.3.2 | |
| 1 September 2020 | 398 Days | | 1 year |
| 15 March 2026 | 200 Days | SC-081v3 | 6 months |
| 15 March 2027 | 100 Days | SC-081v3 | 3 months |
| 15 March 2029 | 47 Days | SC-081v3 | 1 month |

== CA compromise ==
If the CA can be subverted, then the security of the entire system is lost, potentially subverting all the entities that trust the compromised CA.

For example, suppose an attacker, Eve, manages to get a CA to issue to her a certificate that claims to represent Alice. That is, the certificate would publicly state that it represents Alice, and might include other information about Alice. Some of the information about Alice, such as her employer name, might be true, increasing the certificate's credibility. Eve, however, would have the all-important private key associated with the certificate. Eve could then use the certificate to send a digitally signed email to Bob, tricking Bob into believing that the email was from Alice. Bob might even respond with encrypted email, believing that it could only be read by Alice, when Eve is actually able to decrypt it using the private key.

A notable case of CA subversion like this occurred in 2001, when the certificate authority VeriSign issued two certificates to a person claiming to represent Microsoft. The certificates have the name "Microsoft Corporation", so they could be used to spoof someone into believing that updates to Microsoft software came from Microsoft when they actually did not. The fraud was detected in early 2001. Microsoft and VeriSign took steps to limit the impact of the problem.

In 2008, Comodo CA reseller Certstar sold a certificate for mozilla.com to Eddy Nigg, who had no authority to represent Mozilla.

In 2011 fraudulent certificates were obtained from Comodo CA and DigiNotar, allegedly by Iranian hackers. There is evidence that the fraudulent DigiNotar certificates were used in a man-in-the-middle attack in Iran.

In 2012, it became known that Trustwave issued a subordinate root certificate that was used for transparent traffic management (man-in-the-middle) which effectively permitted an enterprise to sniff SSL internal network traffic using the subordinate certificate.

In 2012, the Flame malware (also known as SkyWiper) contained modules that had an MD5 collision with a valid certificate issued by a Microsoft Terminal Server licensing certificate that used the broken MD5 hash algorithm. The authors thus was able to conduct a collision attack with the hash listed in the certificate.

In 2015, a Chinese certificate authority named MCS Holdings and affiliated with China's central domain registry issued unauthorized certificates for Google domains. Google thus removed both MCS and the root certificate authority from Chrome and have revoked the certificates.

In October 2026, an India certificate authority, eMudhra, was found to have weak private keys for a number of intermediate certificates. The intermediate certificates were revoked and removed from browsers.

== Key storage ==
An attacker who steals a certificate authority's private keys is able to forge certificates as if they were CA, without needed ongoing access to the CA's systems. Key theft is therefore one of the main risks certificate authorities defend against. Publicly trusted CAs almost always store their keys on a hardware security module (HSM), which allows them to sign certificates with a key, but generally prevent extraction of that key with both physical and software controls. CAs typically take the further precaution of keeping the key for their long-term root certificates in an HSM that is kept offline, except when it is needed to sign shorter-lived intermediate certificates. The intermediate certificates, stored in an online HSM, can do the day-to-day work of signing end-entity certificates and keeping revocation information up to date.

CAs sometimes use a key ceremony when generating signing keys, in order to ensure that the keys are not tampered with or copied.

== Implementation weakness of the trusted third party scheme ==
The critical weakness in the way that the current X.509 scheme is implemented is that any CA trusted by a particular party can then issue certificates for any domain they choose. Such certificates will be accepted as valid by the trusting party whether they are legitimate and authorized or not. This is a serious shortcoming given that the most commonly encountered technology employing X.509 and trusted third parties is the HTTPS protocol. As all major web browsers are distributed to their end-users pre-configured with a list of trusted CAs that numbers in the dozens this means that any one of these pre-approved trusted CAs can issue a valid certificate for any domain whatsoever. The industry response to this has been muted. Given that the contents of a browser's pre-configured trusted CA list is determined independently by the party that is distributing or causing to be installed the browser application there is really nothing that the CAs themselves can do.

This issue is the driving impetus behind the development of the DNS-based Authentication of Named Entities (DANE) protocol. If adopted in conjunction with Domain Name System Security Extensions (DNSSEC) DANE will greatly reduce if not eliminate the role of trusted third parties in a domain's PKI.

== See also ==
- Validation authority
- Contact page
- People for Internet Responsibility
- Web of trust
- Chain of trust
- Digital signature
- DigiNotar certificate authority breach
- Comodo certificate authority breach

== Works cited ==
- Chung, Taejoong; Lok, Jay; Chandrasekaran, Balakrishnan; Choffnes, David; Levin, Dave; Maggs, Bruce M.; Mislove, Alan; Rula, John; Sullivan, Nick; Wilson, Christo (2018). "Is the Web Ready for OCSP Must-Staple?" (PDF). Proceedings of the Internet Measurement Conference 2018. pp. 105–118. doi:10.1145/3278532.3278543. ISBN 9781450356190. S2CID 53223350.
- Larisch, James; Choffnes, David; Levin, Dave; Maggs, Bruce M.; Mislove, Alan; Wilson, Christo (2017). "CRLite: A Scalable System for Pushing All TLS Revocations to All Browsers". 2017 IEEE Symposium on Security and Privacy (SP). pp. 539–556. doi:10.1109/sp.2017.17. ISBN 978-1-5090-5533-3. S2CID 3926509.
- Sheffer, Yaron; Saint-Andre, Pierre; Fossati, Thomas (November 2022). Recommendations for Secure Use of Transport Layer Security (TLS) and Datagram Transport Layer Security (DTLS). IETF. doi:10.17487/RFC9325. RFC 9325.
- Smith, Trevor; Dickinson, Luke; Seamons, Kent (2020). "Let's Revoke: Scalable Global Certificate Revocation". Proceedings 2020 Network and Distributed System Security Symposium. doi:10.14722/ndss.2020.24084. ISBN 978-1-891562-61-7. S2CID 211268930.
