= Certificate signing request =

Message sent to a certificate authority to apply for a certificate

In public key infrastructure (PKI) systems, a certificate signing request (CSR or certification request) is a message sent from an applicant to a certificate authority of the public key infrastructure (PKI) in order to apply for a digital identity certificate. The CSR usually contains the public key for which the certificate should be issued, identifying information (such as a holder or domain name) and a proof of possession of the corresponding private key (typically in the form of a digital signature, which includes integrity protection). The most common format for CSRs is the PKCS #10 specification, first published in November 1993; others include the more capable Certificate Request Message Format (CRMF) and the SPKAC (Signed Public Key and Challenge) format generated by some web browsers.

Note that neither of the CSR formats authenticate the identity of the requester. The proof of origin of the request must be achieved and verified by other means (typically using a certificate enrollment protocol such as CMP, EST, or ACME), otherwise the obtained certificate has no real security value.

== Procedure ==
Before creating a CSR for an X.509 certificate, the applicant generates a key pair, keeping the private key of that pair secret, e.g.:

$ # https://www.openssl.org/docs/manmaster/man1/openssl-genrsa.html
$ # "openssl genrsa" creates an RSA private key:
$ openssl genrsa -out 2024_wikipedia.org.key

The CSR contains information identifying the applicant (such as a distinguished name), the public key chosen by the applicant, and possibly further information. When using the PKCS #10 format, the request must be self-signed using the applicant's private key, which provides proof of possession (POP) of the private key but limits the use of this format to keys that can be used for (some form of) signing.

The CSR must be accompanied by a proof of origin (i.e., proof of identity of the applicant), which is required for security reasons by the certificate authority. The certificate authority may contact the applicant for further information.

Typical information required in a CSR (sample column from sample X.509 certificate). Note that there are often alternatives for the Distinguished Names (DN), the preferred value is listed.

DN	Information	Description	Sample
CN	Common Name	This is fully qualified domain name that you wish to secure	*.wikipedia.org
O	Organization Name	Usually the legal name of a company or entity and should include any suffixes such as Ltd., Inc., or Corp.	Wikimedia Foundation, Inc.
OU	Organizational Unit	Internal organization department/division name	IT
L	Locality	Town, city, village, etc. name	San Francisco
ST	State	Province, region, county or state. This should not be abbreviated (e.g. West Sussex, Normandy, New Jersey).	California
C	Country	The two-letter ISO code for the country where your organization is located	US
emailAddress	Email Address	The organization contact, usually of the certificate administrator or IT department	

This OpenSSL sample command line uses the details as listed in the table above to create a CSR in PKCS #10 format:

$ # https://www.openssl.org/docs/manmaster/man1/openssl-req.html
$ # "openssl req" creates a certificate signing request in PKCS #10 format:
$ openssl req -sha512 -new -subj "/C=US/ST=California/L=San Francisco/O=Wikimedia Foundation, Inc./CN=*.wikipedia.org" -key 2024_wikipedia.org.key -out 2024_wikipedia.org.csr

The CSR is typically sent to a Registration Authority (RA), which checks the CSR contents and authenticates the applicant. On success the CSR is forwarded to a Certificate Authority (CA), which produces the X.509 public-key certificate, digitally signing it using the CA private key, and sends the new certificate to the applicant.

== Structure of a PKCS #10 CSR ==
A certification request in PKCS #10 format consists of three main parts: the certification request information, a signature algorithm identifier, and a digital signature on the certification request information using the private key related to the public key being certified.

The signature constitutes a self-signature with the key pair of the applicant. Due to the self-signature requirement, this format is applicable only to types of keys that support signing. Yet there are variants of this format that do not include an actual signature, such as described in Appendix C.1 of RFC 5272 (CMS).

The first part contains as its most significant information the public key and the identity of the applicant. The self-signature by the applicant provides a proof of possession (POP). Checking the POP prevents an entity from requesting a bogus certificate of someone else's public key. Thus the private key is required to produce a PKCS #10 CSR. Yet note that the POP for the key pair by the subject entity does not provide any authentication of the subject entity. The proof of origin for the request by the applicant must therefore be provided and checked by other means. Otherwise illegitimate certificates can be produced where the subject/holder information is wrong.

CSR for personal ID certificates and signing certificates usually includes the email address of the ID holder or the name of organisation in case of business ID.

The first part, ASN.1 type CertificationRequestInfo, consists of a version number (which is 0 for all known versions, 1.0, 1.5, and 1.7 of the specifications), the subject name, the public key (algorithm identifier + bit string), and a collection of attributes providing additional information about the subject of the certificate. The attributes can contain required certificate extensions, a challenge-password to restrict revocations, as well as any additional information about the subject of the certificate, possibly including local or future types.

== Example of a PKCS #10 CSR ==
The PKCS#10 standard defines syntax, semantics, and binary format for CSRs for use with X.509. It is encoded in ASN.1 with DER format. Here is an example of how you can examine its ASN.1 structure using OpenSSL:

openssl asn1parse -i -in your_request.p10

A CSR may be represented as a Base64 encoded PKCS#10; an example of which is given below:

-----BEGIN CERTIFICATE REQUEST-----
MIICzDCCAbQCAQAwgYYxCzAJBgNVBAYTAkVOMQ0wCwYDVQQIDARub25lMQ0wCwYD
VQQHDARub25lMRIwEAYDVQQKDAlXaWtpcGVkaWExDTALBgNVBAsMBG5vbmUxGDAW
BgNVBAMMDyoud2lraXBlZGlhLm9yZzEcMBoGCSqGSIb3DQEJARYNbm9uZUBub25l
LmNvbTCCASIwDQYJKoZIhvcNAQEBBQADggEPADCCAQoCggEBAMP/U8RlcCD6E8AL
PT8LLUR9ygyygPCaSmIEC8zXGJung3ykElXFRz/Jc/bu0hxCxi2YDz5IjxBBOpB/
kieG83HsSmZZtR+drZIQ6vOsr/ucvpnB9z4XzKuabNGZ5ZiTSQ9L7Mx8FzvUTq5y
/ArIuM+FBeuno/IV8zvwAe/VRa8i0QjFXT9vBBp35aeatdnJ2ds50yKCsHHcjvtr
9/8zPVqqmhl2XFS3Qdqlsprzbgksom67OobJGjaV+fNHNQ0o/rzP//Pl3i7vvaEG
7Ff8tQhEwR9nJUR1T6Z7ln7S6cOr23YozgWVkEJ/dSr6LAopb+cZ88FzW5NszU6i
57HhA7ECAwEAAaAAMA0GCSqGSIb3DQEBBAUAA4IBAQBn8OCVOIx+n0AS6WbEmYDR
SspR9xOCoOwYfamB+2Bpmt82R01zJ/kaqzUtZUjaGvQvAaz5lUwoMdaO0X7I5Xfl
sllMFDaYoGD4Rru4s8gz2qG/QHWA8uPXzJVAj6X0olbIdLTEqTKsnBj4Zr1AJCNy
/YcG4ouLJr140o26MhwBpoCRpPjAgdYMH60BYfnc4/DILxMVqR9xqK1s98d6Ob/+
3wHFK+S7BRWrJQXcM8veAexXuk9lHQ+FgGfD0eSYGz0kyP26Qa2pLTwumjt+nBPl
rfJxaLHwTQ/1988G0H35ED0f9Md5fzoKi5evU1wG5WRxdEUPyt3QUXxdQ69i0C+7
-----END CERTIFICATE REQUEST-----

The above certificate signing request's ASN.1 DER structure (as parsed by openssl) appears as the following, where the first number is the byte offset, d=depth, hl=header length of the current type, l=length of content:

    0:d=0  hl=4 l= 716 cons: SEQUENCE          
    4:d=1  hl=4 l= 436 cons:  SEQUENCE          
    8:d=2  hl=2 l=   1 prim:   INTEGER           :00
   11:d=2  hl=3 l= 134 cons:   SEQUENCE          
   14:d=3  hl=2 l=  11 cons:    SET               
   16:d=4  hl=2 l=   9 cons:     SEQUENCE          
   18:d=5  hl=2 l=   3 prim:      OBJECT            :countryName
   23:d=5  hl=2 l=   2 prim:      PRINTABLESTRING   :EN
   27:d=3  hl=2 l=  13 cons:    SET               
   29:d=4  hl=2 l=  11 cons:     SEQUENCE          
   31:d=5  hl=2 l=   3 prim:      OBJECT            :stateOrProvinceName
   36:d=5  hl=2 l=   4 prim:      UTF8STRING        :none
   42:d=3  hl=2 l=  13 cons:    SET               
   44:d=4  hl=2 l=  11 cons:     SEQUENCE          
   46:d=5  hl=2 l=   3 prim:      OBJECT            :localityName
   51:d=5  hl=2 l=   4 prim:      UTF8STRING        :none
   57:d=3  hl=2 l=  18 cons:    SET               
   59:d=4  hl=2 l=  16 cons:     SEQUENCE          
   61:d=5  hl=2 l=   3 prim:      OBJECT            :organizationName
   66:d=5  hl=2 l=   9 prim:      UTF8STRING        :Wikipedia
   77:d=3  hl=2 l=  13 cons:    SET               
   79:d=4  hl=2 l=  11 cons:     SEQUENCE          
   81:d=5  hl=2 l=   3 prim:      OBJECT            :organizationalUnitName
   86:d=5  hl=2 l=   4 prim:      UTF8STRING        :none
   92:d=3  hl=2 l=  24 cons:    SET               
   94:d=4  hl=2 l=  22 cons:     SEQUENCE          
   96:d=5  hl=2 l=   3 prim:      OBJECT            :commonName
  101:d=5  hl=2 l=  15 prim:      UTF8STRING        :*.wikipedia.org
  118:d=3  hl=2 l=  28 cons:    SET               
  120:d=4  hl=2 l=  26 cons:     SEQUENCE          
  122:d=5  hl=2 l=   9 prim:      OBJECT            :emailAddress
  133:d=5  hl=2 l=  13 prim:      IA5STRING         :none@none.com
  148:d=2  hl=4 l= 290 cons:   SEQUENCE          
  152:d=3  hl=2 l=  13 cons:    SEQUENCE          
  154:d=4  hl=2 l=   9 prim:     OBJECT            :rsaEncryption
  165:d=4  hl=2 l=   0 prim:     NULL              
  167:d=3  hl=4 l= 271 prim:    BIT STRING        
  442:d=2  hl=2 l=   0 cons:   cont [ 0 ]        
  444:d=1  hl=2 l=  13 cons:  SEQUENCE          
  446:d=2  hl=2 l=   9 prim:   OBJECT            :md5WithRSAEncryption
  457:d=2  hl=2 l=   0 prim:   NULL              
  459:d=1  hl=4 l= 257 prim:  BIT STRING

This was generated by supplying the base64 encoding into the command openssl asn1parse -in your_request.p10 -inform PEM -i where PEM (Privacy-Enhanced Mail) is the encoding of the ASN.1 Distinguished Encoding Rules in base64.
