= Peter Eckersley (computer scientist) =

Australian computer scientist (1970s–2022)

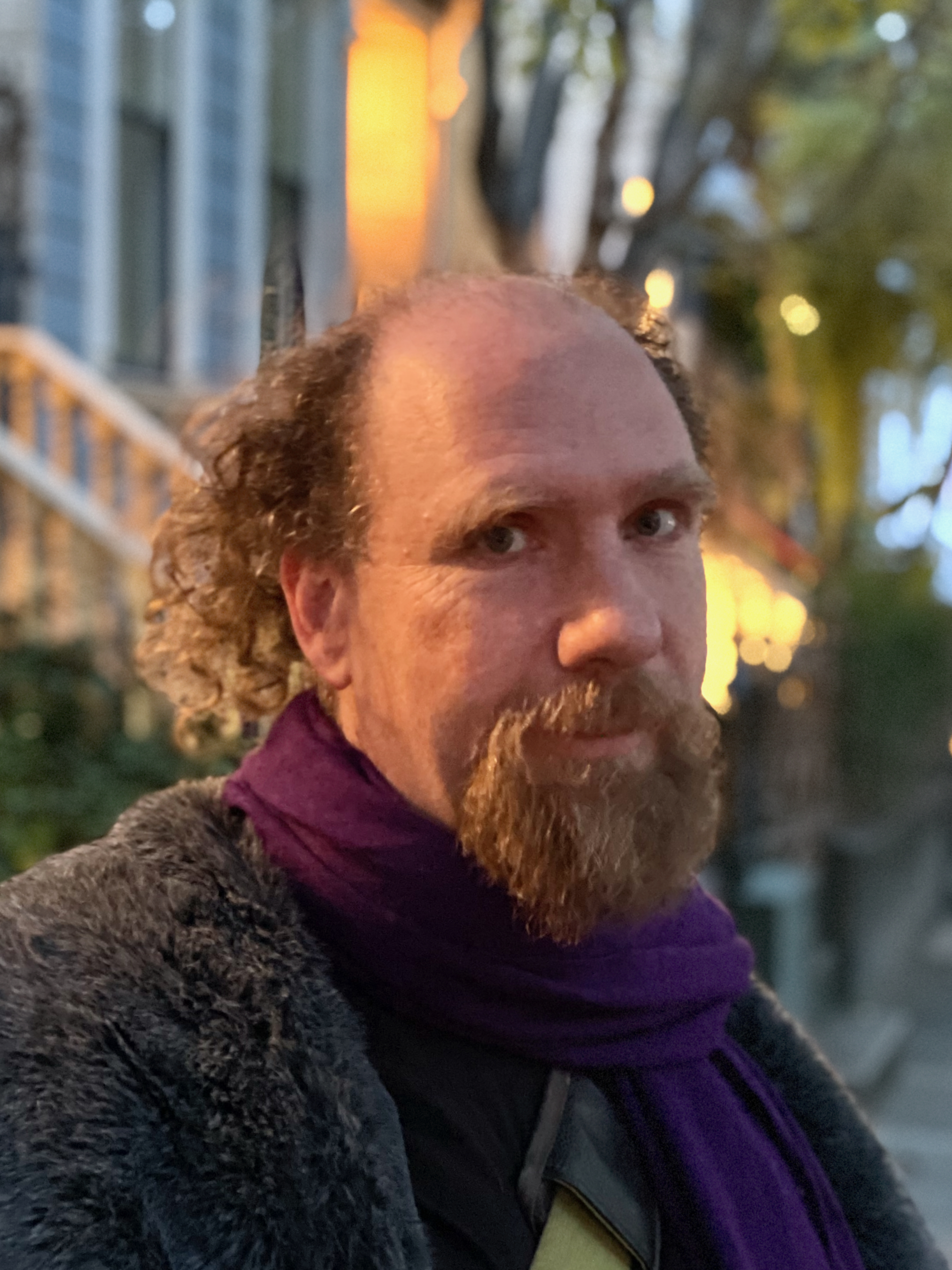
- Eckersley in March 2022
- Born: 1978; Melbourne, Australia
- Died: 2 September 2022 (aged 44); San Francisco, California, U.S.
- Resting place: Cryopreserved at Alcor Life Extension Foundation
- Education: University of Melbourne (PhD)
- Occupations: Computer scientist; computer security researcher; activist
- Known for: Internet privacy activism; Let's Encrypt; AI ethics
- Scientific career
- Thesis: Digital Copyright & The Alternatives: An Interdisciplinary Inquiry (2012)
- Website: pde.is

Peter Daniel Eckersley (1978 – 2 September 2022) was an Australian computer scientist, computer security researcher and activist. From 2006 to 2018, he worked at the Electronic Frontier Foundation, including as chief computer scientist and head of AI policy. In 2018, he left the EFF to become director of research at the Partnership on AI, a position he held until 2020. In 2021, he co-founded the AI Objectives Institute.

While at the Electronic Frontier Foundation, Eckersley started projects including Let's Encrypt, Privacy Badger, Certbot, HTTPS Everywhere, SSL Observatory and Panopticlick. Eckersley was an outspoken advocate on topics including internet privacy, net neutrality and the ethics of artificial intelligence. In 2023, he was inducted into the Internet Hall of Fame.

== Early life and education ==
Peter Daniel Eckersley was born in 1978 in Melbourne, Australia. His mother was an architect who worked to preserve historic buildings, and his father was an electrical engineer. His father was interested in personal computers, an interest he shared with Eckersley, who began writing software by age six or seven.

Eckersley earned his PhD in computer science and law from the University of Melbourne in 2012.

Eckersley moved to the United States, settling in San Francisco, California. There, he started working for the Electronic Frontier Foundation and set up a sharehouse, where he lived with roommates including computer scientist and activist Aaron Swartz.

== Career and activism ==
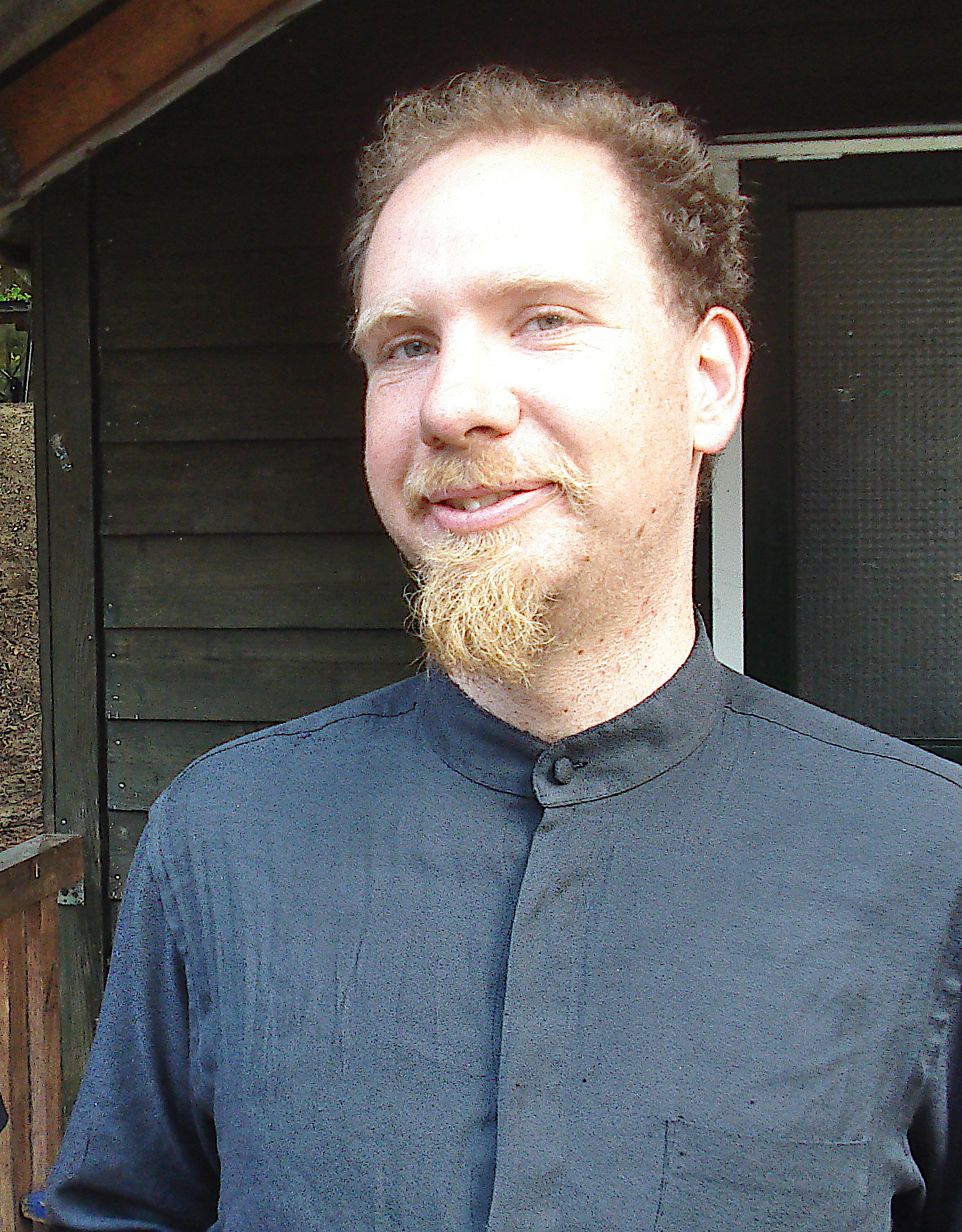
Eckersley in 2009

From 2006 to 2018, Eckersley worked at the Electronic Frontier Foundation (EFF) in roles including technology projects director, chief computer scientist, and head of AI policy. Eckersley advocated openly for net neutrality while with the EFF. In 2007, Eckersley and other collaborators conducted a controlled experiment to prove that the Comcast telecommunications company tampered with peer-to-peer protocols such as BitTorrent through the use of forged reset packets.

Eckersley was prominent in internet privacy, openly critical of web tracking technologies and companies that use them. In 2007, he criticised Facebook for their lack of transparency in user tracking services as well as the use by internet service providers of deep packet inspection of peer-to-peer networks to seek out copyright infringement, often relying purely on IP addresses to identify users in court. His later work in this field resulted in the Panopticlick, an EFF website to test the identifiability of users' web browsers, as well as advocacy for stronger enforcement of the Do Not Track header.

In 2009, Eckersley was a founding member of Toby Ord's Giving What We Can organization, which encourages effective altruism and whose members pledge to give at least 10% of their income to charity.

In 2010, Eckersley again collaborated with the EFF on an open letter against the Stop Online Piracy Act (SOPA), part of the internet-wide response to the act. The open letter was signed by almost 100 computer scientists and internet privacy advocates. He collaborated in that work with Aaron Swartz, another online privacy advocate with close ties to the Electronic Frontier Foundation.

In 2012, Eckersley co-founded Let's Encrypt alongside developers from the Mozilla Corporation and the University of Michigan. Let's Encrypt is a publicly accessible certificate authority that provides for free short-lived SSL certificates that browsers and other software would consider trustable, mediated through the automated ACME protocol. A year after its launch, Let's Encrypt announced they had signed one million certificates. As of September 2022, Let's Encrypt had validated certificates for over 290 million domains. Many other web-scale services for securing sites have built on the certificate infrastructure provided by Let's Encrypt, including Certbot, Caddy, and Traefik.

Eckersley was outspoken against the centralisation of cloud hosting providers, particularly that of AWS, fearing that cloud providers could be compelled to look into users' data.

In 2018, he began focusing on artificial intelligence, with research and policy work focused on applications including predictive policing, autonomous vehicles, cybersecurity and military uses of artificial intelligence. He left EFF to become director of research at the Partnership on AI, a position he held until 2020. In 2021 he co-founded a non-profit pursuing similar goals, the AI Objectives Institute, which was conceived as an institute focused on identifying and aligning the objectives of AI with those of society, and interrogating the values and politics around artificial intelligence. He was also a visiting senior fellow at OpenAI.

During the COVID-19 pandemic, Eckersley advised several groups working on contact tracing and exposure notification on how to preserve user privacy.

=== Research and writing ===
Eckersley published a broad range of technical papers on security, AI, and related policy. Two of his popular papers, How Unique Is Your Browser? and On Locational Privacy, highlighted how vulnerable the internet was to browser fingerprinting and location tracking over time as ways of piercing privacy and anonymity.

== Death ==
Shortly before his death, Eckersley was diagnosed with colon cancer. He sent a message to friends: "If possible, please plasticize or vitrify my brain and leave it on a shelf somewhere with a plaque or durable sticky note that says, 'scan me.'"

Eckersley died on 2 September 2022 in San Francisco of complications from cancer treatment. His brain was preserved by the cryonics organization Alcor Life Extension Foundation soon after. He was remembered by the Wall Street Journal as an "Australian computer scientist," who "worked at a San Francisco nonprofit on projects designed to protect privacy."
