= Certificate Management over CMS =

Internet standard by the IETF

CMC (Certificate Management over CMS)
family:	unknown
field of application :	certificate management
newest version:	RFC 5272
CMC in the TCP/IP model: application / CMC / CMC; application / CMC / HTTP / HTTPS / SMTP / ...; transport / TCP; Internet / IP (IPv4, IPv6); link / Ethernet / Token; Bus / Token; Ring / FDDI / ...
proposed standard:	RFC 5272
obsolete standard:	RFC 2797

The Certificate Management over CMS (CMC) is an Internet Standard published by the IETF, defining transport mechanisms for the Cryptographic Message Syntax (CMS). It is defined in RFC 5272, its transport mechanisms in RFC 5273.

Similarly to the Certificate Management Protocol (CMP), it can be used for obtaining X.509 digital certificates in a public key infrastructure (PKI).

CMS is one of two protocols utilizing the Certificate Request Message Format (CRMF), described in RFC 4211, with the other protocol being CMP.

The Enrollment over Secure Transport (EST) protocol, described in RFC 7030, can be seen as a profile of CMC for use in provisioning certificates to end entities. As such, EST can play a similar role to SCEP.

== See also ==
- Certificate Management Protocol (CMP)
- Simple Certificate Enrollment Protocol (SCEP)
- Enrollment over Secure Transport (EST)
- Automated Certificate Management Environment (ACME)
