= HID Global =

American manufacturer of secure identity products

HID Global Corporation
- Company type: Subsidiary
- Industry: Security
- Founded: 1991; 35 years ago
- Headquarters: Austin, Texas
- Key people: Björn Lidefelt (president and CEO); Ramesh Songukrishnasamy (Senior VP and CTO)
- Products: Photo ID badges Contactless/contact smart cards Smart card readers Card printers Inlays; RFID tags and fobs Biometrics; Physical Identity & Access Management (PIAM); PKI Solutions; FIDO Credentials; Embedded products
- Revenue: ▲US$6.1 Billion 2011 (ASSA ABLOY)
- Net income: ▲US$1.0 Billion 2011 (ASSA ABLOY)
- Total equity: ▲US$3.32 Billion 2011 (ASSA ABLOY)
- Number of employees: 4,000
- Parent: Assa Abloy
- Website: www.hidglobal.com

HID Global Corporation is an American manufacturer of secure identity products. The company is an independent subsidiary of multinational physical security conglomerate Assa Abloy. Björn Lidefelt was appointed CEO on 27 January 2020. He succeeded Stefan Widing, who led HID Global for over four years.

== History ==
Originally formed to develop radio frequency identification technologies, HID Global was formed in 1991 as Hughes Identification Devices, a subsidiary of Hughes Aircraft Company with offices in California and Scotland. The original 125-kilohertz and 400-kilohertz proximity technology had been pioneered by Destron/IDI (formerly Identification Devices Inc.), in Boulder, Colorado, and used primarily for Animal Identification and Proximity Access Control, and to a lesser degree in Manufacturing Processes, Tyre tracking and a few other Asset Identification applications. Already a supplier to Destron/ID of low-frequency microchips, Hughes Aircraft Company acquired exclusive rights to the Access Control and Industrial markets, leading to the formation of Hughes Identification Devices.

In 1994, the office in Scotland was closed and the European business passed to a UK based independent distributor, ID Plus Ltd who were later acquired by HID Corporation Ltd in August 1999.

In October 1995, Hughes management, with help from Citibank Venture Capital, combined its military communications and display products groups with its AML Wireless Systems organization and Hughes Identification Devices (HID) to form Palomar Technologies Corporation. It was at that point that the decision was made to focus efforts on RFID for physical access control, and five years later, the company was acquired by the world's largest lock-maker, Swedish conglomerate Assa Abloy AB.

== Products ==
The company sells physical access control products, logical access control products, and secure issuance products. Its other business segments include virtualization technology, cashless payment, government ID, RFID for industrial and logistics applications, Animal ID products, and related professional services.

HID manufactures and licenses several types of technologies, from Wiegand products to 13.56 MHz iCLASS, MIFARE, and DESFire, as well as the 125 kHz Indala and Prox cards. Migration readers from various 125 kHz Prox technologies to 13.56 MHz iCLASS were introduced in 2007.

HID Global’s PKI certificates offerings include cloud‑based Certificate Lifecycle Management through its PKI‑as‑a‑Service (PKIaaS) platform, which provides automated certificate discovery, issuance, renewal and revocation; trusted digital certificates delivered through HID IdenTrust, a globally deployed certificate authority serving enterprises and government agencies; and SSL/TLS certificate services via ZeroSSL, acquired by HID in 2024 to expand its public key infrastructure and website security capabilities.

== Manufacturing ==
The company is based in Austin, Texas with other production facilities in Asia and Europe. Some of these facilities are located in Hong Kong, China and Galway, Ireland.

It also has research and development centers in Cardiff, United Kingdom, Bengaluru and Chennai in India, Suresnes near Paris in France, Prague in Czech Republic, Kraków in Poland, Vienna and Graz in Austria, Stockholm in Sweden, Milpitas in Northern California and Salt Lake City in Utah. The company also has a design facility in Chennai, India.

== Partners ==
HID Global works with a variety of partner such as OEMs, system integrators, application developers and channel partners in domestic and international markets. Some OEM partners include Siemens, Honeywell, Lenel (UTC Fire & Security), and Tyco. The company also partners with computer manufacturers to create new products. HID worked with Dell to develop HID on the Desktop, a three-component PC logon application that won the 2009 Smart Card Alliance Award for Outstanding Technology. HID later partnered with Panasonic to integrate an HID Global RFID module into Panasonic's Personal Identification Mini Dock to support reading biometric passports.

HID Global worked with Inside Secure (formally known as Inside Contactless) and US Bank to supply HID iCLASS contactless smart card technology in the US Bank PayID card program that was the 2010 Paybefore Award Winner for Best Innovative Program. The PayID card program uses a multifunction card that supports contactless physical access to U.S. Bank facilities, along with contactless payment and traditional magnetic stripe cards for purchases made by U.S. Bank employees.

HID Global technologies are integrated with a range of third-party platforms and solutions within the physical security ecosystem, including open platform systems such as those developed by IDCUBE.

== Distributors ==
- 1991: Formed as Hughes Identification Devices, a subsidiary of Hughes Aircraft
- 1995: Became a subsidiary of Palomar Technological Companies, changed name to HID Corporation
- 1996: Acquired Sensor Engineering, adding Wiegand products
- 2000: Acquired by Assa Abloy AB
- 2001: HID acquired Motorola's Indala RFID access control business
- 2003: Acquired the card and reader business of Dorado Products, Inc.
- 2006: Acquired Fargo Electronics, adding card issuance technology
- 2006: Merged with Assa Abloy sister company Indala
- 2006: Formed HID Global
- 2007: Acquired Integrated Engineering, adding flexible MIFARE-based reader technology
- 2008: Merger of HID Global and Assa Abloy Identification Technologies Group
- 2010: Acquired ActivIdentity for US$162 million - is active in intelligent identity
- 2011: Acquired LaserCard, a provider of secure ID products, for US$80 million.
- 2012: Acquired EasyLobby for secure visitor management software and products.
- 2013: Acquired Codebench for FIPS 201 integration with physical access control systems
- 2014: Acquired Lumidigm for biometric authentication solutions
- 2014: Acquired IdenTrust, a provider of digital identities
- 2015: Acquired IAI, a provider of personalization solutions for identity documents
- 2015: Acquired Quantum Secure, a provider of identity management software
- 2016: Acquired DemoTeller, a provider of instant issuance solutions for the financial market
- 2017: Acquired Mercury Security, an OEM supplier of controllers for physical access control
- 2018: Acquired Crossmatch, a provider of biometric enrollment and identity devices
- 2019: Acquired PTI Security Systems, a company specializing in access control systems for the self‑storage industry
- 2019: Acquired HydrantID, a managed public key infrastructure (PKI) services company
- 2020: Acquired Access-IS, a technology provider of miniaturized reader devices said to be ideal for mission-critical environments
- 2022: Acquired Vizinex RFID, a provider of custom and embeddable RFID solutions
- 2024: Acquired ZeroSSL, an SSL certificate provider based in Austria
- 2025: Acquired IDmelon, based in Vancouver
