= List of Go software and tools =

List of software related to the Go programming language

This is a list of Go software and tools, including compilers, development environments, build tools, testing frameworks, web frameworks, database tools, and related software for the Go programming language.

== Core toolchain ==
- Go — programming language and toolchain
- go command — build and package tool
- gofmt — source code formatter
- go vet — static analysis tool

== Compilers and runtimes ==
- gc — default Go compiler
- gccgo — GCC front end for Go
- GopherJS — Go-to-JavaScript compiler
- gollvm — Go compiler using the LLVM backend
- llgo — experimental Go frontend for LLVM
- TinyGo — compiler for embedded systems and WebAssembly
- Yaegi — Go interpreter

== Development environments and editors ==
- Emacs — text editor with Go support
- GoLand — JetBrains integrated development environment
- LiteIDE — Go-focused integrated development environment
- Neovim — text editor with Go support
- TextMate — text editor with Go support
- Vim — text editor with Go support
- Visual Studio Code — editor with Go support

== Language servers and editor tools ==
- delve — debugger
- gopls — Go language server
- golangci-lint — lint runner
- revive — linter
- staticcheck — static analysis tool

== Build, dependency and release tools ==
- Air — live reload development tool
- dep — deprecated dependency manager
- Go modules — dependency management system
- Goreleaser — release automation tool
- Mage — build tool
- Task — task runner

== Testing and benchmarking ==
- benchstat — benchmark comparison tool
- Ginkgo — testing framework
- GoMock — mock generation tool
- testify — testing toolkit
- testing — standard testing package

== Web frameworks and HTTP tools ==
- Beego — web framework
- Caddy — web server
- Chi — router
- Echo — web framework
- Fiber — web framework
- Gin — web framework
- Gorilla Mux — router
- Hugo — static site generator
- Revel — web framework
- Traefik — reverse proxy and load balancer

== RPC and API tools ==
- Goa — API design framework
- gRPC — remote procedure call framework
- grpc-gateway — REST gateway
- oapi-codegen — OpenAPI code generator
- Swag — OpenAPI documentation tool

== Database and ORM tools ==
- Bun — SQL toolkit and ORM
- CockroachDB client libraries — database drivers and tools
- ent — entity framework
- GORM — object–relational mapper
- sqlx — SQL toolkit

== Command-line and terminal tools ==
- Bubble Tea — terminal user interface framework
- Cobra — command-line framework
- pflag — flag parsing library
- urfave/cli — command-line framework
- Viper — configuration library

== GUI toolkits and application frameworks ==
- Fyne — cross-platform graphical user interface toolkit

== Documentation, generation and analysis ==
- errcheck — unchecked error checker
- godoc — documentation tool
- goimports — import management tool
- mockgen — mock generator
- pkgsite — package documentation site
- Prometheus — monitoring and alerting toolkit
- stringer — code generation tool
- wire — dependency injection code generator

== Package hosting and community services ==
- GoCenter — former Go package repository
- pkg.go.dev — package documentation and discovery site
- proxy.golang.org — module proxy

== Major applications written in Go ==
- Consul — service networking platform
- Docker — containerization platform
- InfluxDB — time-series database written in Go
- Kubernetes — container orchestration platform
- Ollama — platform for running and managing large language models locally
- Restic — backup program
- Syncthing — peer-to-peer file synchronization utility
- Terraform — infrastructure as code tool
- Vault — secrets management tool

== See also ==
- Comparison of integrated development environments
- Lists of programming software development tools
