= Certification Practice Statement =

A Certification Practice Statement (CPS) is a document from a certificate authority or a member of a web of trust which describes their practice for issuing and managing public key certificates.

Some elements of a CPS include documenting practices of:

- issuance
- publication
- archiving
- revocation
- renewal

By detailing the practices of issuance, revocation and renewal, a CPS aids entities in judging the relative reliability of a given certificate authority.

== Certificate authorities ==
In a certificate authority, the CPS should derive from the organization's certificate policy and may be referenced in issued certificates.

== Web of trust ==
Because individuals act as certifiers in a web of trust, individual CPS documents are sometimes used. For example, in a PGP WoT, the CPS might state that the certifying entity checked two forms of legal government ID before signing the person's public key.

== Digital signatures ==
When verifying digital signatures, it's necessary to review the CPS so as to determine the meaning of the issuance of the certificate by the certifying entity.
