= ISRG =

ISRG may refer to:

- Intuitive Surgical (NASDAQ: ISRG), manufacturer of robotic surgical systems
- Internet Security Research Group, public-benefit corporation that focuses on Internet security
- Information Security Research Group, research group of computer scientists and mathematicians
