= Peter Eckersley =

Peter Eckersley may refer to:

- Peter Eckersley (engineer) (1892–1963), pioneer of British Broadcasting
- Peter Eckersley (cricketer) (1904–1940), captain of Lancashire County Cricket Club and MP
- Peter Eckersley (TV producer) (1936–1981), British television producer associated with Granada Television
- Peter Eckersley (computer scientist) (1979–2022), Australian computer security researcher and activist
