= Invengo =

Invengo Information Technology Co., Ltd.
- Company type: Public
- Traded as: SZSE: 002161
- Industry: Internet of things
- Founded: 1993
- Founder: Xu Yusuo
- Headquarters: Shenzhen
- Area served: Worldwide
- Key people: Chen Guangzhu (chairperson)
- Products: RFID products
- Website: www.invengo.com

Invengo (Chinese: 远望谷; SZSE: 002161), fully referred to as Invengo Information Technology Co., Ltd., also known as Yuanwanggu, is a Chinese IoT developer founded by Xu Yusuo in 1993. It was listed on the Shenzhen Stock Exchange in August 2007. Its main products are RFID and related products. It is the first public company in the RFID industry in domestic China, and a provider of Magic Passports for the Shanghai Disney Resort. The company was funded by Delta Capital, and the VC arm of UOB.

Headquartered in Shenzhen, Invengo established operations in South Korea, Singapore, Australia, and the US, among others. It acquired FE Technologies, SML and other RFID companies. In 2007, it implemented an $80 million RFID program for the Chinese Ministry of Railways. In September 2023, it participated as a contractor in the Guangxi Regional Cooperation and Integration Promotion Investment Program, which was financed by the Asian Development Bank.

== History ==
In 1993, Invengo was formed in Shenzhen. In the same year, it set up Invengo Textile Services in France. It initiated the introduction of VC in 2003. In 2007, it landed on the SME Board, under the symbol "002161.SZ".

In 2010, Invengo derived more than half of its revenue from railway contracts. In 2014, it took part in the development of the Australian app AUDIO. In the same year, it purchased FE Technologies.

Invengo's total revenue in the first quarter of 2016 exceeded 100 million yuan. In 2018, OEP 10 B.V. was bought by the firm. In March 2021, its textile services business was purchased by HID Global.
