= IdenTrust =

Digital certificate authority

- Formation: 1999
- Founded at: New York City
- Type: Certificate authority
- Headquarters: Salt Lake City, Utah
- Services: Internet security, Public key infrastructure, IoT security
- Parent organization: HID Global
- Website: www.identrust.com

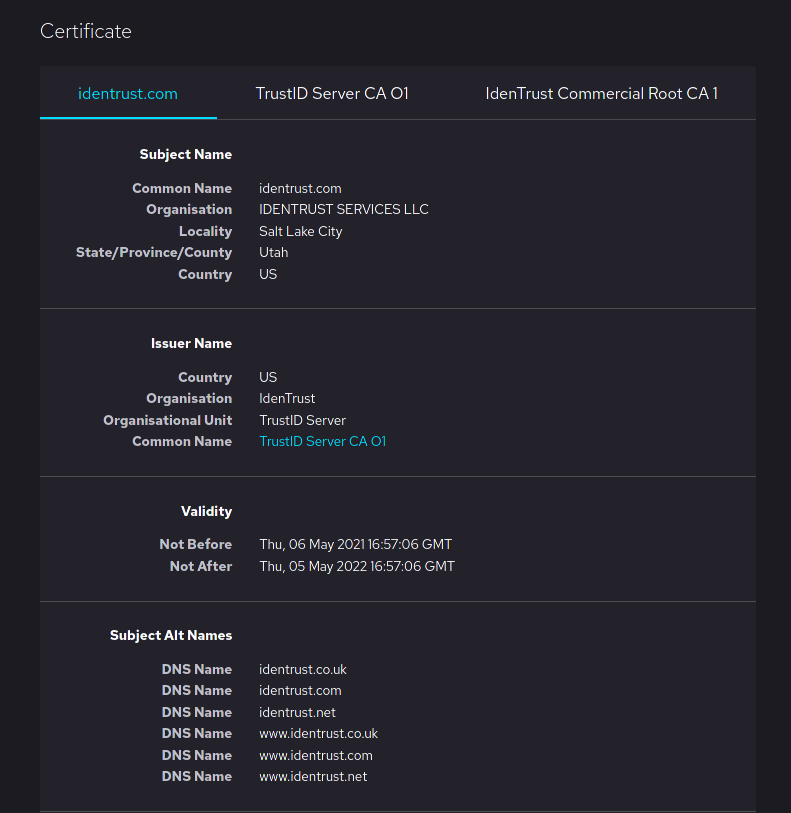
An example of IdenTrust certificate

IdenTrust, part of HID Global and headquartered in Salt Lake City, Utah, is a public key certificate authority that provides digital certificates to financial institutions, healthcare providers, government agencies and enterprises. As a certificate authority (CA), IdenTrust provides public key infrastructure (PKI) and validation for digital certificates, including TLS/SSL certificates, email security via S/MIME certificates, digital signature certificates, code signing certificates and x.509 certificates for protecting network and IoT devices.

Announced in 1999, its founding members included ABN AMRO, Barclays, Chase Manhattan, Citibank, Bank of America, Bankers Trust, Deutsche Bank, and HypoVereinsbank. Early on it opted for a technology-neutral policy, developing standards that multiple technology vendors could follow in implementing products and services for its members and customers.

Initially located in New York, NY, it is presently headquartered in Salt Lake City, UT. In 2002 it acquired Digital Signature Trust (DST) for an undisclosed amount, which had previously acquired the American Bankers Association's ABAEcom project.

IdenTrust was acquired by HID Global in 2014. They cross-signed the intermediate certificates of Let's Encrypt in 2015, so that Let's Encrypt CA could begin operations and be trusted in all major browsers as well.

IdenTrust is accredited to issue digital certificates by the General Services Administration (GSA).
