= Access IS =

Manufacturer of information systems and specialized hardware

Access-IS Limited
- Company type: Private
- Industry: Manufacturing
- Founded: 1985; 41 years ago, in Reading, England
- Defunct: March 16, 2021
- Headquarters: Reading, Berkshire, UK
- Products: Computer keyboards Bar code readers MSR; OCR; Passport readers
- Parent: HID Global
- Website: www.hidglobal.com/access-is

Access-IS Limited develops and manufactures electronic systems designed to accurately capture and transfer information into electronic systems based on 30 years’ experience in image processing, RFID/NFC technology and barcode reading. Access-IS also manufactures specialist keyboards for banking and PoS (Point of Sale) applications.

Operating in over 72 countries Access-IS is focussed on three specialised verticals; Airline/Airport, ID Document Readers & Security and Transport Ticketing. In addition to its custom keyboards which are used by banks, trading floors, airlines and retailers, the product range also includes boarding gate readers, a range of document readers for ID document and age verification and paper and electronic ticket readers for ground transport and access control.

Access-IS has its headquarters in Reading, Berkshire, UK, with approximately 60 salaried staff.

Access-IS is the trading name of Access Limited.

== Background to the name ==
Access-IS is an abbreviation of 'Access Interfacing Solutions'. Originally Access Keyboards Limited, the company was renamed Access Ltd and adopted the brand name Access IS in October 2007 to reflect the broader product offering the company offered. The new logo device was intended to allude to the company's history in keyboard design by using the shape of a keyboard return key. The two interlocking shapes that make up the logo device was intended to represent the process of interfacing to pass data between systems, or between media and host systems.

== Technology ==
Optical character recognition reading, MICR, Magnetic stripe card reading, biometric fingerprint readers, smart card and contactless smart card reading, e-passport decoding and reading, bar code scanners and airport boarding gate readers.

== History ==
=== 1980s ===
1984 - The company was incorporated in December 1984 and was wholly owned by the Videcom Group of companies. Access IS (then named Access Keyboards) began trading January 1985.
1989 - Became authorised distributor for Cherry keyboards.

=== 1990s ===
1992 - Gained ISO 9001 accreditation.
1994 - Became autonomous in 1994 after a management buy-out with funding provided by 3i.
1997 - First programmable point of sale keyboards launched.

=== 2000 onwards ===
2004 - 3i's shares were sold back to the company.
2006 - Access manufacture BGR (boarding gate readers).
2007 - Subsidiary established in Atlanta.
2007 - Access Keyboards Limited renamed Access Limited, and began trading as Access-IS.
2009 - Access-IS gained ISO 9001:2008. (Certificate No. 21703)
2011 - Access-IS released a range of ID Document Readers for document authentification
2014 - The Kingdom of Saudi Arabia accredited two Access-IS electronic passport readers for use by Hajj and Umrah tour operators and agents worldwide to process the passports of pilgrims.

2015 - The owners sold the company and was refinanced by private equity partners.
2020: HID Global acquired Access-IS from private equity partners.

== Products ==
- Airports/Airline – Access-IS designs and manufactures technology for reading barcodes, RFID/NFC and passports/ID cards for a range of applications from check-in to boarding.
- ID & Security - Products include; e-Passport, e-ID and e-Driving License readers for Government and Commercial applications. From small OEM OCR readers (for integration into mobile devices) to full/half page passport readers, Access-IS products are designed for applications such as; Border Control, Immigration, Document Issuance, Law Enforcement, Banking, Gaming, Retail, KYC and Anti-Money Laundering etc.
- Transport Ticketing - Barcode and RFID/NFC readers for self-service data capture applications products include; ticket readers and validators for public transport systems, event and stadium entrance and exit as well as other applications.
