= Traefik Proxy =

Open-source webserver software

- Developer: Traefik Labs
- Initial release: 2016; 10 years ago
- Stable release: 3.6.5 / 16 December 2025; 3 months ago
- Written in: Go
- Operating system: Linux, Windows, macOS, FreeBSD, OpenBSD
- Type: Web server
- License: MIT
- Website: https://traefik.io/traefik
- Repository: github.com/traefik/traefik

Traefik (pronounced traffic), or Traefik Proxy, is an open-source HTTP reverse proxy and load balancer. Version 1.0.0 was released in 2016, and was written in Go by Emile Vauge. Traefik and its associated documentation are under the MIT License.

== History ==
The project was first started in 2015, and version 1.0.0 was released a year later in 2016. The developer behind the project, Emile Vauge, stated that traditional proxies at the time were not "well-suited for these dynamic environments" like Kubernetes, whereas Traefik "reconfigures itself on the fly" by querying container orchestrator APIs and reacting to changes in them.

By 2018, the project had 19,000 stars on GitHub, and 10 million pulls on DockerHub.

By 2020, the project had been downloaded 2 billion times, and had 30,000 stars on GitHub. In September 2020, Containous, the company founded by Traefiks original developer, which also supports the development of Traefik Proxy, was renamed to Traefik Labs.

By 2022, traefik had been downloaded over 3 billion times, and had over 100 plugins available, making it one of the most popular software solutions in its category.

== Functionality ==
Traefik has support for the following features:

- Automatically obtaining a TLS certificate through the ACME protocol, thus acting as a TLS termination proxy.
- WebSocket, gRPC, and HTTP/2
- Dynamic configuration via a REST API
- Metrics for Prometheus

Among others.

Traefik can also query the APIs of different "providers" (container engines, container orchestrators, key-value stores, or cloud providers) and then dynamically reconfigure its routes when it detects a change. For instance, it can query the Docker API to detect which ports are exposed by containers, listen to events like container starts and stops, and read the Docker labels of other containers which it uses to infer routing rules.

== Traefik Hub ==
Traefik Hub is a commercial product offered separately from the Traefik reverse proxy. It is a GitOps-based, API management solution.

== See also ==
- Nginx
- Apache HTTP Server
- Comparison of web server software
- List of Go software and tools
