= ABA digital signature guidelines =

Guidelines published by American Bar Association

The ABA digital signature guidelines are a set of guidelines published on 1 August 1996 by the American Bar Association (ABA) Section of Science and Technology Law. The authors are members of the Section's Information Security Committee.

== Overview ==
The document was the first overview of principles and a framework for the use of digital signatures and authentication in electronic commerce from a legal viewpoint, including technologies such as certificate authorities and public key infrastructure (PKI). The guidelines were a product of a four-year collaboration by 70 lawyers and technical experts from a dozen countries, and have been adopted as the model for legislation by some states in the US, including Florida and Utah.

The Digital Signature Guidelines were followed by the Public Key Infrastructure Assessment Guidelines published by the ABA in 2003.

A similar effort was undertaken in Slovenia by the Digital Signature Working Group (within the Chamber of Commerce and Industry of Slovenia (CCIS)).
