= Internet Security Research Group =

Non-profit focused on Internet security

- Founded: May 24, 2013
- Founders: Josh Aas, Eric Rescorla
- Type: 501(c)(3) non-profit organization
- Tax ID no.: 46-3344200
- Registration no.: C3569614
- Legal status: Active
- Purpose: Internet Security
- Location: 548 Market St, PMB 77519, San Francisco, California 94104, United States
- Region served: Global
- Website: abetterinternet.org isrg.org

The Internet Security Research Group (ISRG) is a public-benefit non-profit corporation based in California which focuses on Internet security. The group is known for hosting and running the Let's Encrypt service, which aims to make Transport Layer Security (TLS) certificates available for free in an automated fashion. Josh Aas serves as the group's executive director.

== Projects ==
ISRG has three project areas:

- Let's Encrypt, a certificate authority that provides free certificates, with components including the Automatic Certificate Management Environment protocol
- Prossimo, an initiative that supports memory safety projects including ntpd-rs, Rustls, and Rust for Linux
- Divvi Up, a telemetry service

== Board members ==
The Internet Security Research Group has 10 board members as of June 2024.

- Josh Aas (Internet Security Research Group) — ISRG Executive Director
- J. Alex Halderman (University of Michigan)
- Vicky Chin (Mozilla)
- Aanchal Gupta (Independent)
- Jennifer Granick (ACLU)
- Pascal Jaillon (OVH)
- Richard Barnes (Cisco Systems)
- Christine Runnegar (Internet Society)
- Erica Portnoy (Electronic Frontier Foundation)
- David Nalley (Amazon)
