= Let's Encrypt =

Non-profit certificate authority

- Formation: November 18, 2014; 11 years ago
- Founder: Electronic Frontier Foundation; Mozilla Foundation; University of Michigan; Akamai Technologies; Cisco Systems
- Headquarters: San Francisco, California, U.S.
- Coordinates: 37.800322°N 122.449951°W
- Services: X.509 certificate authority
- Parent organization: Internet Security Research Group
- Budget: US$3.6 million (2019)
- Staff: 27 (2023)
- Website: letsencrypt.org

Let's Encrypt is a non-profit certificate authority run by the Internet Security Research Group (ISRG) that provides X.509 certificates for Transport Layer Security (TLS) encryption without charging fees. It is the world's largest certificate authority, used by more than 700 million websites, with the goal of creating a more secure and privacy-respecting web through the widespread adoption of HTTPS. The Internet Security Research Group, the provider of the service, is a public benefit organization. Major sponsors of the ISRG include the Electronic Frontier Foundation (EFF), the Mozilla Foundation, OVHcloud, Cisco Systems, Facebook, Google Chrome, the Internet Society, AWS, nginx, and the Gates Foundation. Other partners include the certificate authority IdenTrust, the University of Michigan, and the Linux Foundation.

== Overview ==
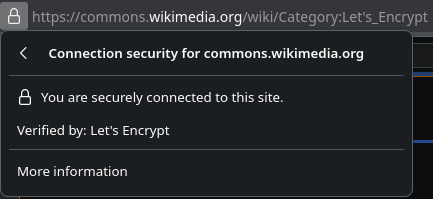
Example of a website using Let's Encrypt

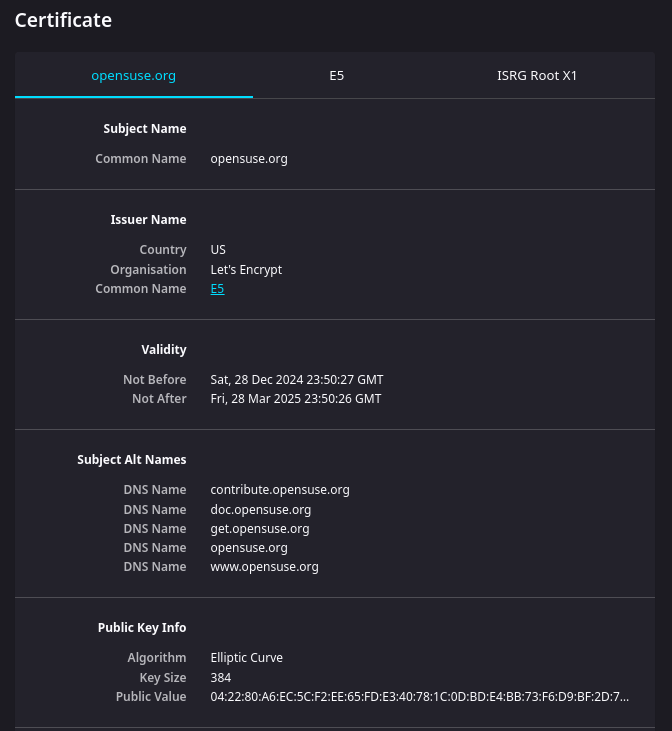
Example of a Let's Encrypt certificate

The mission of the organization is to create a more secure and privacy-respecting World Wide Web by promoting the widespread adoption of HTTPS. Let's Encrypt certificates are valid for 90 days by default, during which renewal can take place at any time. Optionally, certificates can be issued which are valid for 45 days (tlsserver profile) and 6 days (shortlived profile). This is handled by an automated process designed to overcome manual creation, validation, signing, installation, and renewal of certificates for secure websites. The project claims its goal is to make encrypted connections to World Wide Web servers ubiquitous. By eliminating payment, web server configuration, validation email management and certificate renewal tasks, it is meant to significantly lower the complexity of setting up and maintaining TLS encryption.

On a Linux web server, execution of only two commands is sufficient to set up HTTPS encryption and acquire and install certificates. To that end, a software package was included into the official Debian and Ubuntu software repositories. Current initiatives of major browser developers such as Mozilla and Google to deprecate unencrypted HTTP are counting on the availability of Let's Encrypt. The project is acknowledged to have the potential to accomplish encrypted connections as the default case for the entire Web.

The service only issues domain-validated certificates, since they can be fully automated. Organization Validation and Extended Validation Certificates both require human validation of any registrants, and are therefore not offered by Let's Encrypt. Support of ACME v2 and wildcard certificates was added in March 2018. The domain validation (DV) utilized by Let's Encrypt dates back to 2002 and was at first controversial when introduced by GeoTrust before becoming a widely accepted method for the issuance of SSL certificates.

By being as transparent as possible, the organization hopes to both protect its own trustworthiness and guard against attacks and manipulation attempts. For that purpose it regularly publishes transparency reports, publicly logs all ACME transactions (e.g. by using Certificate Transparency), and uses open standards and free software as much as possible.

== History ==
The Let's Encrypt project was started in 2012 by two Mozilla employees, Josh Aas and Eric Rescorla, together with Peter Eckersley at the Electronic Frontier Foundation and J. Alex Halderman at the University of Michigan. Internet Security Research Group, the company behind Let's Encrypt, was incorporated in May 2013.

Let's Encrypt was announced publicly on November 18, 2014.

On January 28, 2015, the ACME protocol was officially submitted to the IETF for standardization. On April 9, 2015, the ISRG and the Linux Foundation declared their collaboration. The root and intermediate certificates were generated in the beginning of June. On June 16, 2015, the final launch schedule for the service was announced, with the first certificate expected to be issued sometime in the week of July 27, 2015, followed by a limited issuance period to test security and scalability. General availability of the service was originally planned to begin sometime in the week of September 14, 2015. On August 7, 2015, the launch schedule was amended to provide more time for ensuring system security and stability, with the first certificate to be issued in the week of September 7, 2015 followed by general availability in the week of November 16, 2015.

On September 14, 2015, Let's Encrypt issued its first certificate, which was for the domain helloworld.letsencrypt.org. On the same day, ISRG submitted its root program applications to Mozilla, Microsoft, Google and Apple.

On October 19, 2015, the intermediate certificates became cross-signed by IdenTrust, causing all certificates issued by Let's Encrypt to be trusted by all major browsers.

On November 12, 2015, Let's Encrypt announced that general availability would be pushed back and that the first public beta would commence on December 3, 2015. The public beta ran from December 3, 2015 to April 12, 2016. It launched on April 12, 2016.

On March 3, 2020, Let's Encrypt announced that it would have to revoke over 3 million certificates on March 4, due to a flaw in its Certificate Authority software. Through working with software vendors and contacting site operators, Let's Encrypt was able to get 1.7 million of the affected certificates renewed before the deadline. They ultimately decided not to revoke the remaining affected certificates, as the security risk was low and the certificates were to expire within the next 90 days. The mass-revocation event has significantly increased the global revocation rate.

In March 2020, Let's Encrypt was awarded the Free Software Foundation's annual Award for Projects of Social Benefit.

On February 27, 2020, Let's Encrypt announced having issued a billion certificates.

In April 2022, Let's Encrypt was awarded the Levchin Prize for “fundamental improvements to the certificate ecosystem that provide free certificates for all”.

As of 2025, Let's Encrypt serves more than 700 million websites worldwide, making it the largest certificate authority in the world.

In January 2025, Let's Encrypt announced the retirement of its free email expiry notifications and recommended Red Sift Certificates Lite as its certificate monitoring service.

== Technology ==
=== Chain of trust ===
==== ISRG Root X1 (RSA) ====
In June 2015, Let's Encrypt announced the generation of their first RSA root certificate, ISRG Root X1. The root certificate was used to sign two intermediate certificates, which are also cross-signed by the certificate authority IdenTrust. One of the intermediate certificates is used to sign issued certificates, while the other is kept offline as a backup in case of problems with the first intermediate certificate. Because the IdenTrust certificate was already widely trusted by major web browsers, Let's Encrypt certificates can normally be validated and accepted by relying parties even before browser vendors include the ISRG root certificate as a trust anchor.

==== ISRG Root X2 (ECDSA) ====
Let's Encrypt developers planned to generate an ECDSA root key back in 2015, but then pushed back the plan to early 2016, then to 2019, and finally to 2020. On September 3, 2020, Let's Encrypt issued six new certificates: one new ECDSA root named "ISRG Root X2", four intermediates, and one cross-sign. The new ISRG Root X2 is cross-signed with ISRG Root X1, Let's Encrypt's own root certificate. Let's Encrypt did not issue an OCSP responder for the new intermediate certificates and instead plans to rely solely on certificate revocation lists (CRLs) to recall compromised certificates and short validity periods to reduce danger of certificate compromise.

=== ACME protocol ===
The challenge–response protocol used to automate enrolling with the certificate authority is called Automatic Certificate Management Environment (ACME). It can query either Web servers or DNS servers controlled by the domain covered by the certificate to be issued. Based on whether the resulting responses match the expectations, control of the enrollee over the domain is assured (domain validation). The ACME client software can set up a dedicated TLS server that gets queried by the ACME certificate authority server with requests using Server Name Indication (Domain Validation using Server Name Indication, DVSNI), or it can use hooks to publish responses to existing Web and DNS servers.

The validation processes are run multiple times over separate network paths. Checking whether DNS entries are provisioned is done from multiple geographically diverse locations to make DNS spoofing attacks harder to carry out.

ACME interactions are based on exchanging JSON documents over HTTPS connections. The specification developed by the Internet Engineering Task Force (IETF) is a proposed standard, RFC 8555.

Prior to the completion and publication of RFC 8555, Let's Encrypt implemented a pre-standard draft of the ACME protocol. RFC 8555 introduced breaking changes and as such it has been dubbed ACMEv2. Let's Encrypt implemented the new version and started pushing existing clients into upgrades. The nudging was implemented with intermittent down-times of the ACMEv1 API. The end-of-lifetime was announced with dates and phases in "End of Life Plan for ACMEv1". Since November 8, 2019, ACMEv1 no longer accepts new account registrations. Since June 2020, ACMEv1 stopped accepting new domain validations. From January 2021, ACMEv1 underwent 24-hour brownouts. The ACMEv1 API was turned off completely on June 1, 2021.

=== Software implementation ===
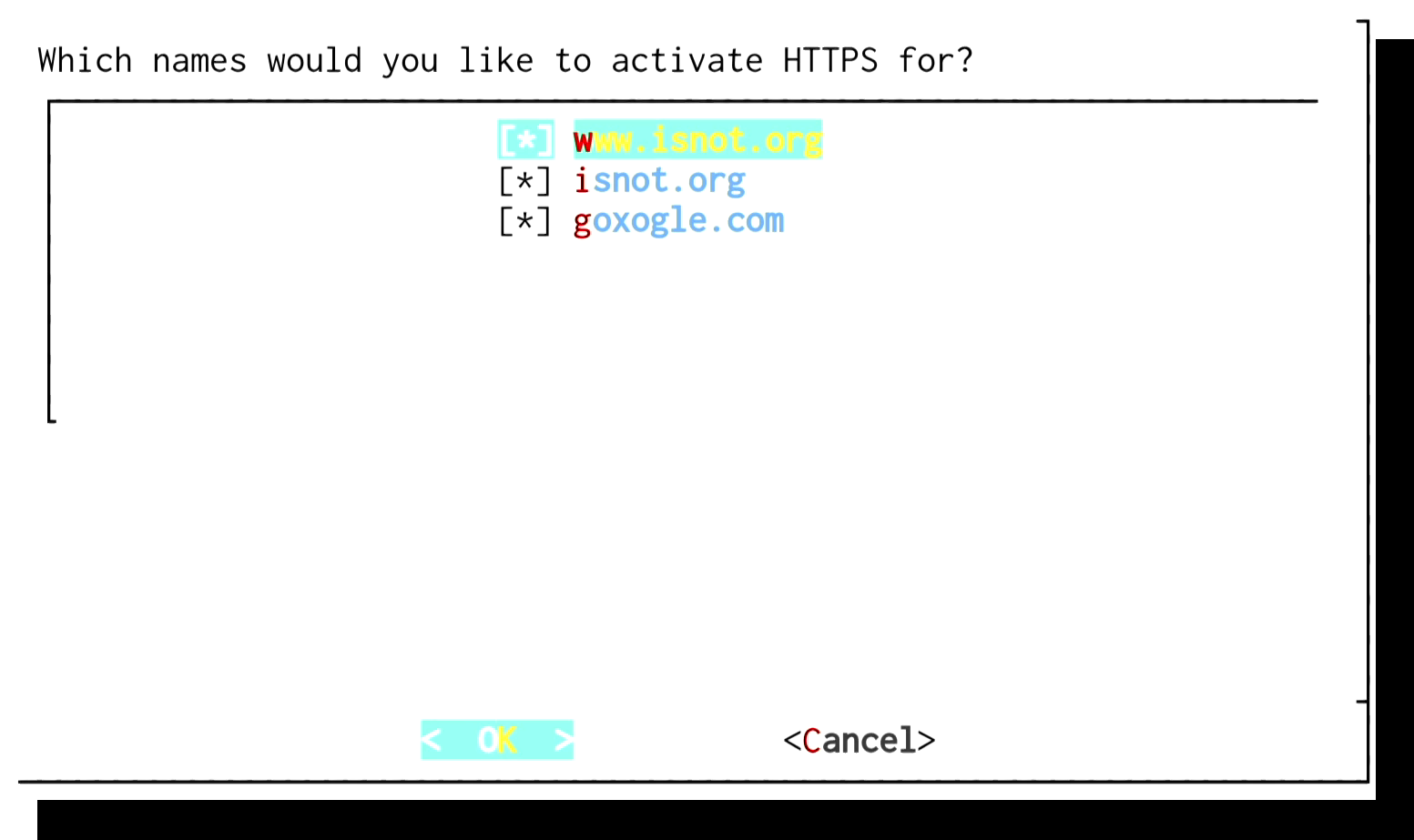
Domain selection dialogue

The certificate authority consists of a piece of software called Boulder, written in Go, that implements the server side of the ACME protocol. It is published as free software with source code under the terms of version 2 of the Mozilla Public License (MPL). It provides a RESTful API that can be accessed over a TLS-encrypted channel.

An Apache-licensed Python certificate management program called certbot (formerly letsencrypt) gets installed on the client side (the Web server of an enrollee). This is used to order the certificate, to conduct the domain validation process, to install the certificate, to configure the HTTPS encryption in the HTTP server, and later to regularly renew the certificate. After installation and agreeing to the user license, executing a single command is enough to get a valid certificate installed. Additional options like OCSP stapling or HTTP Strict Transport Security (HSTS) can also be enabled. Automatic setup initially only works with Apache and nginx.

As of October 2026, Let's Encrypt issues certificates valid for 90 days. The reason given is that these certificates "limit damage from key compromise and mis-issuance" and encourage automation. Starting February 10, 2027, Let's Encrypt plans to reduce certificate validity period to 64 days.

Initially, Let's Encrypt developed its own ACME client – Certbot – as an official implementation. This has been transferred to Electronic Frontier Foundation and its name "letsencrypt" has been changed to "certbot". There is a large selection of ACME clients and projects for a number of environments developed by the community.

== See also ==
- HTTPS Everywhere
