= Automatic Certificate Management Environment =

Protocol to manage public key certificates

ACME
- Official logo
- Original authors: Richard Barnes; Jacob Hoffman-Andrews; Daniel McCarney; James Kasten
- Developer: ISRG
- Release: December 2015
- Stable release: 2.0 / March 2019
- Standards: RFC 8555; Extensions: RFC 8657 RFC 8737; RFC 8738 RFC 8739; RFC 8823 RFC 9115; RFC 9444 RFC 9447; RFC 9448 RFC 9538; RFC 9773 RFC 9799; RFC 9891
- Website: tools.ietf.org/html/rfc8555
- Repository: https://github.com/ietf-wg-acme

The Automatic Certificate Management Environment (ACME) protocol is a communication protocol for automating interactions between certificate authorities and their users' servers, allowing the automated deployment of public key infrastructure at very low cost. It was designed by the Internet Security Research Group (ISRG) for their Let's Encrypt service.

The protocol, based on passing JSON-formatted messages over HTTPS, has been published as an Internet Standard in RFC 8555 by its own chartered IETF working group.

== History ==
An automated certificate management protocol was being developed simultaneously by a team led by Alex Halderman at the University of Michigan and by Peter Eckersley at the Electronic Frontier Foundation (EFF), and another team at Mozilla Corporation led by Josh Aas and Eric Rescorla. Upon learning of each other's existence, the two teams joined to create the Internet Security Research Group (ISRG) in May 2013, a public-benefit non-profit corporation, of which Aas became director.

The ISRG continued to develop the ACME protocol for use in their Let's Encrypt certificate authority (CA), with the goal of creating a free, open, secure and private internet, as well as their CA softwares Boulder and Certbot. The aims of the ACME protocol were to lower the cost of publicly trusted TLS certificates and eliminate the complexity and error-prone nature of installing new certificates. A 2013 study co-authored by Halderman found that, on the internet, only 45% of TLS certificates were correctly configured, and about 20% failed to be replaced before their expiration. Although another automatic certificate handling protocol, Certificate Management Protocol, was standardized in 1999, the ISRG differentiates ACME as "tailored to the needs of the Web PKI and ... designed with scalable, automated issuance as a core goal."

Before April 2015 when ISRG hired their first full-time employee, the Let's Encrypt software stack, including ACME, was developed by engineers from EFF and Mozilla with assistance from Cisco and IdenTrust, including work by computer scientists from the University of Michigan on what would become Certbot. The Let's Encrypt certificate authority, the first to support ACME, was opened to the public in December 2015 using the still proprietary protocol referred to as 'ACMEv1'. This version was given for public standardization to a newly created ACME working group of the Internet Engineering Task Force under the Internet Society in February 2015. The finalized standard was published in March 2019 as RFC 8555 under the authorship of Richard Barnes of Cisco, Jacob Hoffman-Andrews of the EFF, Daniel McCarney of Let's Encrypt, and James Kasten of the University of Michigan, with contributions from educational or public research institutions and cybersecurity companies. (Note: Contributions to RFC 8555 were made by SSLMate.com, the French Institute for Research in Computer Science and Automation, Hemio e.V., DigiCert, Sectigo, and the University of Oxford.) The ACME protocol continues to receive published extensions into 2026.

== Function ==
The ACME protocol functions from the server (CA) point of view by assigning to each client an ACME account, bound to a URI on the server. An account is created by the client querying the server's directory URI, after which the server responds with additional informational endpoints along with the CA's terms of service agreement. An ACME account is created after the client agrees to the terms by setting the relevant reply field to true.

The client then obtains pre-authorization from the server, ensuring the forthcoming certificate will meet the server's requirements, by sending a subset of the certificate's fields. The server then replies with an 'order object' URL. This packet contains a list of authorization methods supported by the server which ensure the client is in possession of the subject of the potential certificate. The client downloads an authorization token from the URL(s) indicated in the response and makes this token available, e.g. by creating a DNS record containing it or opening an HTTP endpoint responding with it. After the authorization token has been made available at the address of the desired certificate's subject, the client notifies the server that it is prepared for validation which is carried out by the server in accessing the authorization token.

Once the authorization is complete the client sends a certificate signing request (RFC 2986) which contains the certificate to be signed, resulting in an updated order object containing the decision of the CA. If the request was valid, the CA has signed the client's certificate and the client may download it at the returned URL.

Functionality also exists for certificate revocation, account deletion, and other forms of authentication.

== Client implementations ==
The ISRG provides free and open-source reference implementations for ACME: certbot is a Python-based implementation of server certificate management software using the ACME protocol, and boulder is a certificate authority implementation, written in Go. Client implementations are available for Rust in the acme-client and instant_acme crates.

Since 2015 a large variety of client options have appeared for all operating systems. OpenBSD offers acme-client, its own ACME client implementation and certificate manager.

Web servers like Caddy, Traefik Proxy, nginx (starting in August, 2025), and Apache HTTP Server (2.4.30 and later) have built in support for automatically acquiring a TLS certificate using the ACME protocol.

== API versions ==
=== API version 1 ===
API v1 specification was published on April 12, 2016. It supports issuing certificates for fully-qualified domain names, such as example.com or cluster.example.com, but not wildcards like *.example.com. Let's Encrypt turned off API v1 support on 1 June 2021.

=== API version 2 ===
API v2 was released March 13, 2018 after being pushed back several times. ACME v2 is not backwards compatible with v1. Version 2 supports wildcard domains, such as *.example.com, allowing for many subdomains to have trusted TLS, e.g. https://cluster01.example.com, https://cluster02.example.com, https://example.com, on private networks under a single domain using a single shared "wildcard" certificate. A major new requirement in v2 is that requests for wildcard certificates require the modification of a Domain Name Service TXT record, verifying control over the domain.

Changes to ACME v2 protocol since v1 include:

- The authorization/issuance flow has changed
- JWS request authorization has changed
- The "resource" field of JWS request bodies is replaced by a new JWS header: "url"
- Directory endpoint/resource renaming
- URI → URL renaming in challenge resources
- Account creation and ToS agreement are combined into one step. Previously, these were two steps.
- A new challenge type was implemented, TLS-ALPN-01. Two earlier challenge types, TLS-SNI-01 and TLS-SNI-02, were removed because of security issues.

== Extension Standards ==
Published ACME Extension standards
| Document | Description |
|---|---|
| RFC 8657 | DNS resource record to stop unauthorized issuance (extends RFC 8659) |
| RFC 8737 | Adds authentication challenge type which allows verification on the TLS layer (pre-handshake, not transport protected) |
| RFC 8738 | Allows IP address subjects |
| RFC 8739 | Adds profile for short-term, automatically renewed certificates |
| RFC 8823 | Allows issuance of S/MIME certificates |
| RFC 9115 | ACME profile for generating delegated certificates |
| RFC 9444 | Allows subdomain subjects |
| RFC 9447 | Adds authentication challenge type using third-party token |
| RFC 9448 | Adds profile for VoIP providers |
| RFC 9538 | Supports delegating HTTPS delivery across servers |
| RFC 9773 | Allows servers to suggest renewal time for load balancing |
| RFC 9799 | Allows .onion subjects |
| RFC 9891 | Supports Delay-tolerant networking (RFC 4843) |

Draft ACME Extension Standards (non-expired only)
| Document | Description |
|---|---|
| Draft profiles | Adds ability for servers to present and clients to request preset certificate configurations (already in use by Let's Encrypt/Boulder) |
| Draft openid-federation | Allows client authentication via OpenID |
| Draft rats | Allows client authentication via Remote Attestation Procedures (RFC 9334), for enterprise issuance to devices |
| Draft authority-token-jwtclaimcon | Allows client authentication via JWTClaimConstraints (RFC 8226) and EnhancedJWTClaimConstraints (RFC 9118) |
| Draft dns-account-label | Adds ability for multiple client systems to independently verify a subject |
| Draft dns-persist | Adds authentication challenge type suited to IoT devices and multi-tenant servers |
| Draft device-attest | Adds authentication challenge for devices which have proprietary means of generating cryptographic attestation |
| Draft integrations | Adds integration infrastructure capable of accommodating a number of attestation mechanisms |

== See also ==
- Simple Certificate Enrollment Protocol, a previous attempt at an automated certificate deployment protocol.
- Certificate Management Protocol, another protocol capable of automatic certificate issuance.
