= EJBCA =

Free public key infrastructure certificate authority

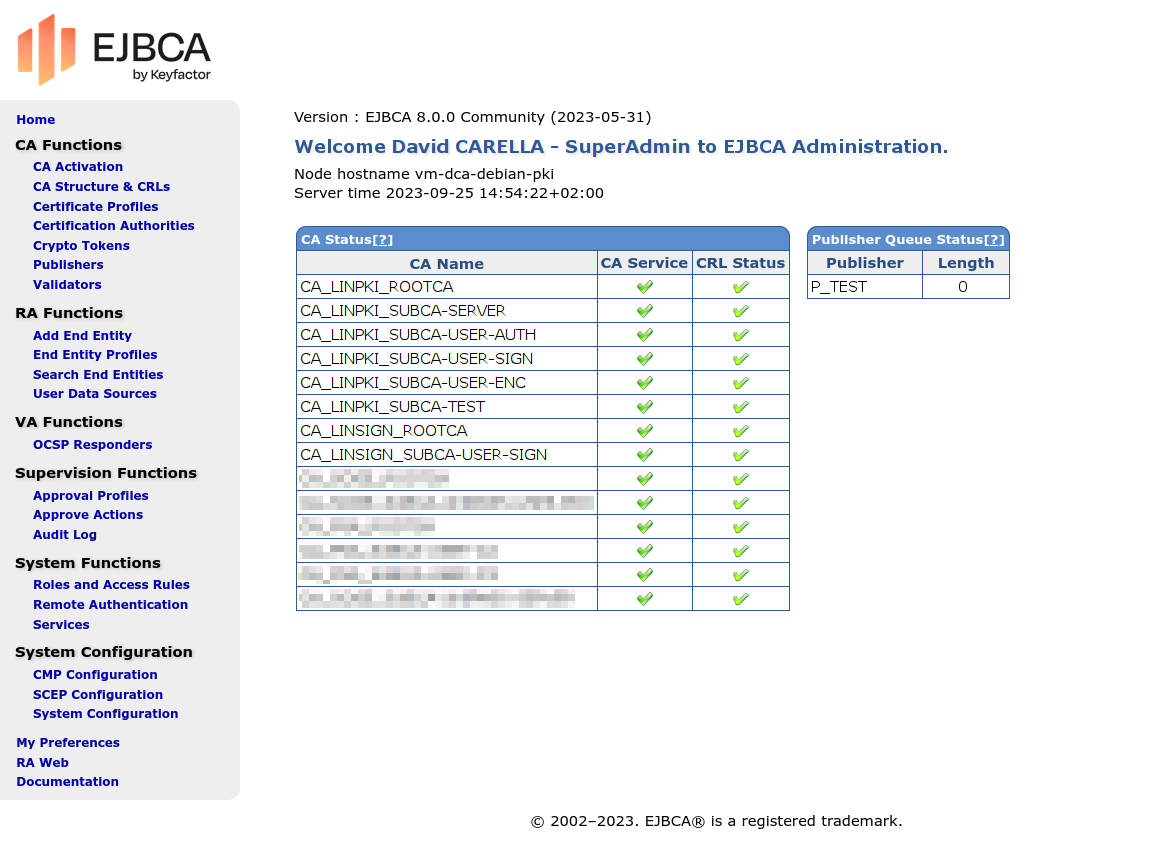
- EJBCA 8.0.0 – Web administration
- Developer: Keyfactor
- Release: December 5, 2001
- Stable release: 9.6.3 / August 31, 2026
- Written in: Java on Java EE
- Operating system: Cross-platform
- Available in: Bosnian, Chinese, Czech, English, French, German, Japanese, Portuguese, Swedish, Ukrainian, Vietnamese
- Type: PKI Software
- License: LGPL-2.1-or-later
- Website: www.ejbca.org
- Repository: https://github.com/Keyfactor/ejbca-ce

EJBCA is a free and open-source public key infrastructure (PKI) and certificate authority software package originally maintained and sponsored by the Swedish for-profit company PrimeKey Solutions AB, which holds the copyright to most of the codebase, and is now a part of Keyfactor Inc. based in the United States. The project's source code is available under the terms of the GNU Lesser General Public License (LGPL). The EJBCA software package is used to install a privately operated certificate authority, validation authority and registration authority. This is in contrast to commercial certificate, validation and/or authorities that are operated by a trusted third party. Since its inception EJBCA has been used as certificate authority software for different use cases, including eGovernment, endpoint management, research, energy, eIDAS, telecom, networking, and for usage in SMEs.

== See also ==
- Public key infrastructure
