= PKCS =

Group of public-key cryptography standards

Public Key Cryptography Standards (PKCS) are a group of public-key cryptography intervendor standards first developed by RSA Security, with involvement from Apple, Digital, Lotus Development, Microsoft, MIT, Northern Telecom, and Sun Microsystems, first published in June 1991.

The PKCS series of standards began development internally at RSA Laboratories in March 1991 with the "broad design goals" of maintaining compatibility with existing Privacy-Enhanced Mail (PEM) protocol certificates, allow handling of arbitrary data, adding richer information in certificate attributes, supporting Diffie-Hellman key exchange, and creating protocols to be some day incorporated into International Telecommunication Union X.200 standards by basing it on existing ITU-T standards such as ASN.1 and BER. PKCS then taken by RSA to the US National Institute of Standards and Technology's Open Systems Interconnection Workshop, an organization created in 1983 by NIST at the request of industry to provide a forum for industry co-operation in computer interconnection protocols. Development of the PKCS protocols was undertaken in the 1991 sessions of the OSI Workshop under the Security Special Interest Group chaired by Trusted Information Systems. However, PKCS did not appear in the final OSI Workshop yearly publication and was instead published as an OSI working document, the first publicly available version of the protocols. Though not industry standards because the company retained control over them, some of the standards have moved into the "standards track" processes of relevant standards organizations since May 1997, such as the IETF and the PKIX working group.

Key Updates (2023–2025):

- Integration of PKCS #7 and PKCS #12 into broader standards like S/MIME and TLS.
- Evolution of PKCS #11 to support newer hardware and cloud services; support for NIST's ML-DSA and ML-KEM.
- Involvement of PKCS standards in post-quantum cryptography efforts, with NIST's ongoing standardization.
- Growing adoption of PKCS standards in the context of blockchain and digital assets.

PKCS Standards Summary
	Version	Name	Standards	Comments
PKCS #1	2.2	RSA Cryptography Standard	RFC 8017	Defines the mathematical properties and format of RSA public and private keys (ASN.1-encoded in clear-text), and the basic algorithms and encoding/padding schemes for performing RSA encryption, decryption, and producing and verifying signatures.
PKCS #2	-	Withdrawn		No longer active. Covered RSA encryption of message digests; subsequently merged into PKCS #1 by PKCS#1 v1.5 in 1993.
PKCS #3	1.4	Diffie–Hellman Key Agreement Standard		A cryptographic protocol that allows two parties that have no prior knowledge of each other to jointly establish a shared secret key over an insecure communications channel.
PKCS #4	-	Withdrawn		No longer active. Covered RSA key syntax; subsequently merged into PKCS #1 by PKCS#1 v1.5 in 1993.
PKCS #5	2.1	Password-based Encryption Standard	RFC 8018	See PBKDF2.
PKCS #6	1.5	Extended-Certificate Syntax Standard		Defines extensions to the old v1 X.509 certificate specification. Obsoleted by v3 of the same.
PKCS #7	1.5	Cryptographic Message Syntax Standard	RFC 2315 RFC 5652	Used to sign and/or encrypt messages under a PKI. Used also for certificate dissemination (for instance as a response to a PKCS #10 message). Formed the basis for S/MIME, which is as of 2010 based on RFC 5652, an updated Cryptographic Message Syntax Standard (CMS). Often used for single sign-on.
PKCS #8	2.0	Private-Key Information Syntax Standard	RFC 5958	Used to carry private and public keys (encrypted or unencrypted).
PKCS #9	2.0	Selected Attribute Types	RFC 2985	Defines selected attribute types for use in PKCS #6 extended certificates, PKCS #7 digitally signed messages, PKCS #8 private-key information, and PKCS #10 certificate-signing requests.
PKCS #10	1.7	Certification Request Standard	RFC 2986	Format of messages sent to a certification authority to request certification of a public key. See certificate signing request.
PKCS #11	3.2	Cryptographic Token Interface		Also known as "Cryptoki". An API defining a generic interface to cryptographic tokens (see also hardware security module). Often used in single sign-on, public-key cryptography and disk encryption systems. RSA Security has turned over further development of the PKCS #11 standard to the OASIS PKCS 11 Technical Committee.
PKCS #12	1.1	Personal Information Exchange Syntax Standard	RFC 7292	Defines a file format commonly used to store private keys with accompanying public key certificates, protected with a password-based symmetric key. PFX is a predecessor to PKCS #12. This container format can contain multiple embedded objects, such as multiple certificates. Usually protected/encrypted with a password. Usable as a format for the Java KeyStore and to establish client authentication certificates in Mozilla Firefox. Usable by Apache Tomcat.
PKCS #13	–	Elliptic-curve cryptography Standard		(Apparently abandoned, only reference is a proposal from 1998.)
PKCS #14	–	Pseudo-random Number Generation		(Apparently abandoned, no documents exist.)
PKCS #15	1.1	Cryptographic Token Information Format Standard	ISO/IEC 7816-15	Defines a standard allowing users of cryptographic tokens to identify themselves to applications, independent of the application's Cryptoki implementation (PKCS #11) or other API. RSA has relinquished IC-card-related parts of this standard to ISO/IEC 7816-15.
