= Efail =

== Computing ==
- EFAIL, a security hole in encrypted email delivery systems

== Geography ==
- Efail Fach
- Efail Isaf
- Cae Llety-yr-efail
