= CryptoGraf =

Secure messaging application for smartphones

- Developers: CryptoGraf Co., Ltd.
- Stable release: 2.0 / July 9, 2007
- Operating system: Symbian, Windows Mobile
- Type: Encryption
- Website: www.cryptograf.com

CryptoGraf is a secure messaging application for smartphones running Symbian OS and Windows Mobile. It allows the user to compose and send SMS and MMS messages that are encrypted and digitally signed using methods that are based on the S/MIME standard. Secure e-mail messaging is not supported.

The cryptographic algorithms supported by CryptoGraf include AES, RSA and SHA-256.

RSA public keys of other users are stored in a "Crypto Contacts" list. The user sends an encrypted SMS or MMS to a recipient listed in Crypto Contacts. Keys must be exchanged before messages can be sent. The way a Crypto Contact is received determines the trust level assigned to the key:

- High trust for Crypto Contacts received by Bluetooth.
- Medium trust for Crypto Contacts received via High trust contacts.
- Low trust for Crypto Contacts received by SMS or MMS.

The Crypto Contacts list is based on a trust model similar to the Web of trust known from PGP. Crypto Contacts are compatible with X.509 digital certificates and contain RSA (1024/2048 bit) public keys. Messages are encrypted using AES-256 bit and digitally signed using RSA (1024/2048 bit) with SHA-256. CryptoGraf is integrated with standard messaging application in both Symbian and Windows Mobile and stores messages in the default Inbox, Sent and other folders.

== CryptoGraf in the press ==
CryptoGraf got attention from local newspaper after their first release.

- The Nation, 23 January 2007. Data-encryption firm upbeat

== See also ==
- S/MIME
- PGP
- Public key infrastructure
- Random number generator
- X.509
- Web of trust
