= Oracle Big Data Appliance =

The Oracle Big Data Appliance consists of hardware and software from Oracle Corporation sold as a computer appliance. It was announced in 2011, and is used for the consolidating and loading unstructured data into Oracle Database software.

== History ==
Oracle announced the Oracle Big Data Appliance on October 3, 2011, at Oracle OpenWorld. It was similar to the Oracle Exadata Database Machine and announced with the Oracle Exalytics Business Intelligence Machine.

The original hardware components of the appliance consisted of a full rack configuration with 864GB of main memory and 432 TB of storage. A full rack consists of 18 servers nodes each of which had two 6-core Intel processors, 48 GB memory per node (upgradable to 96 GB or 144 GB), 12 x 2TB disks per node, InfiniBand Networking and 10 GbE connectivity.

== Software ==
The product includes an open-source distribution of Apache Hadoop. Support from Cloudera was announced in January 2012.

The Oracle NoSQL Database, Oracle Data Integrator with an adapter for Hadoop Oracle Loader for Hadoop, an open source distribution of R, Oracle Linux, and Oracle Java Hotspot Virtual Machine were also mentioned in the announcement.
