= PKCS 8 =

Cryptography standard

In cryptography, PKCS #8 is a standard syntax for storing private key information. PKCS #8 is one of the family of standards called Public-Key Cryptography Standards (PKCS) created by RSA Laboratories. The latest version, 1.2, is available as RFC 5208.

The PKCS #8 private key may be encrypted with a passphrase using one of the PKCS #5 standards defined in RFC 2898, which supports multiple encryption schemes.

A new version 2 was proposed by S. Turner in 2010 as RFC 5958 and might obsolete RFC 5208 someday in the future.

PKCS #8 private keys are typically exchanged in the PEM base64-encoded format, for example:

-----BEGIN PRIVATE KEY-----
MIIBVgIBADANBgkqhkiG9w0BAQEFAASCAUAwggE8AgEAAkEAq7BFUpkGp3+LQmlQ
Yx2eqzDV+xeG8kx/sQFV18S5JhzGeIJNA72wSeukEPojtqUyX2J0CciPBh7eqclQ
2zpAswIDAQABAkAgisq4+zRdrzkwH1ITV1vpytnkO/NiHcnePQiOW0VUybPyHoGM
/jf75C5xET7ZQpBe5kx5VHsPZj0CBb3b+wSRAiEA2mPWCBytosIU/ODRfq6EiV04
lt6waE7I2uSPqIC20LcCIQDJQYIHQII+3YaPqyhGgqMexuuuGx+lDKD6/Fu/JwPb
5QIhAKthiYcYKlL9h8bjDsQhZDUACPasjzdsDEdq8inDyLOFAiEAmCr/tZwA3qeA
ZoBzI10DGPIuoKXBd3nk/eBxPkaxlEECIQCNymjsoI7GldtujVnr1qT+3yedLfHK
srDVjIT3LsvTqw==
-----END PRIVATE KEY-----

-----BEGIN ENCRYPTED PRIVATE KEY-----
MIIBrzBJBgkqhkiG9w0BBQ0wPDAbBgkqhkiG9w0BBQwwDgQImQO8S8BJYNACAggA
MB0GCWCGSAFlAwQBKgQQ398SY1Y6moXTJCO0PSahKgSCAWDeobyqIkAb9XmxjMmi
hABtlIJBsybBymdIrtPjtRBTmz+ga40KFNfKgTrtHO/3qf0wSHpWmKlQotRh6Ufk
0VBh4QjbcNFQLzqJqblW4E3v853PK1G4OpQNpFLDLaPZLIyzxWOom9c9GXNm+ddG
LbdeQRsPoolIdL61lYB505K/SXJCpemb1RCHO/dzsp/kRyLMQNsWiaJABkSyskcr
eDJBZWOGQ/WJKl1CMHC8XgjqvmpXXas47G5sMSgFs+NUqVSkMSrsWMa+XkH/oT/x
P8ze1v0RDu0AIqaxdZhZ389h09BKFvCAFnLKK0tadIRkZHtNahVWnFUks5EP3C1k
2cQQtWBkaZnRrEkB3H0/ty++WB0owHe7Pd9GKSnTMIo8gmQzT2dfZP3+flUFHTBs
RZ9L8UWp2zt5hNDtc82hyNs70SETaSsaiygYNbBGlVAWVR9Mp8SMNYr1kdeGRgc3
7r5E
-----END ENCRYPTED PRIVATE KEY-----
