= Delegated Path Discovery =

Trusted-server-querying method for public key certificate information

Delegated Path Discovery (DPD) is a method for querying a trusted server for information about a public key certificate.

DPD allows clients to obtain collated certificate information from a trusted DPD server. This information may then be used by the client to validate the subject certificate.

The requirements for DPD are described in RFC 3379.

== See also ==
- Delegated Path Validation
- SCVP
