= Privacy-Enhanced Mail =

Family of file formats associated with RFC 1421

Privacy-enhanced mail (PEM) is a de facto file format for storing and sending cryptographic keys, certificates, and other data, based on a set of 1993 IETF standards defining "privacy-enhanced mail". While the original standards were never broadly adopted and were supplanted by PGP and S/MIME, the textual encoding they defined became very popular. The PEM format was eventually formalized by the IETF in RFC 7468.

== Format ==
Many cryptography standards use ASN.1 to define their data structures, and Distinguished Encoding Rules (DER) to serialize those structures. Because DER produces binary output, it can be challenging to transmit the resulting files through systems, like electronic mail, that only support ASCII.

The PEM format solves this problem by encoding the binary data using base64. PEM also defines a one-line header, consisting of -----BEGIN, a label, and -----, and a one-line footer, consisting of -----END, a label, and -----. The label determines the type of message encoded. Common labels include CERTIFICATE, CERTIFICATE REQUEST, PRIVATE KEY and X509 CRL.

-----BEGIN PRIVATE KEY-----

-----END PRIVATE KEY-----

PEM data is commonly stored in files with a ".pem" suffix, a ".cer" or ".crt" suffix (for certificates), or a ".key" suffix (for public or private keys). The label inside a PEM file represents the type of the data more accurately than the file suffix, since many different types of data can be saved in a ".pem" file. In particular PEM refers to the header and base64 wrapper for a binary format contained within, but does not specify any type or format for the binary data, so that a PEM file may contain "almost anything base64 encoded and wrapped with BEGIN and END lines".

=== Examples ===
- An operating system might provide a PEM file containing a list of trusted CA certificates, each of which in its own BEGIN/END sections;
- A web server might be configured with a "chain" file containing an end-entity certificate plus a list of intermediate certificates, each of which in its own BEGIN/END sections.

== Development ==
The PEM format was first developed in the privacy-enhanced mail series of Request for Comments (RFCs): RFC 1421, RFC 1422, RFC 1423, and RFC 1424. These standards assumed prior deployment of a hierarchical public key infrastructure (PKI) with a single root. Such a PKI was never deployed, due to operational costs and legal liability concerns. These standards were eventually obsoleted by PGP and S/MIME, competing e-mail encryption standards.

== History ==
The initiative to develop Privacy-Enhanced Mail began in 1985 on behalf of the PSRG (Privacy and Security Research Group) also known as the Internet Research Task Force. This task force is a subsidiary of the Internet Architecture Board (IAB) and their efforts have resulted in the Requests for Comment (RFCs) which are suggested Internet guidelines.
