= Jane Silber =

American businesswoman and CEO

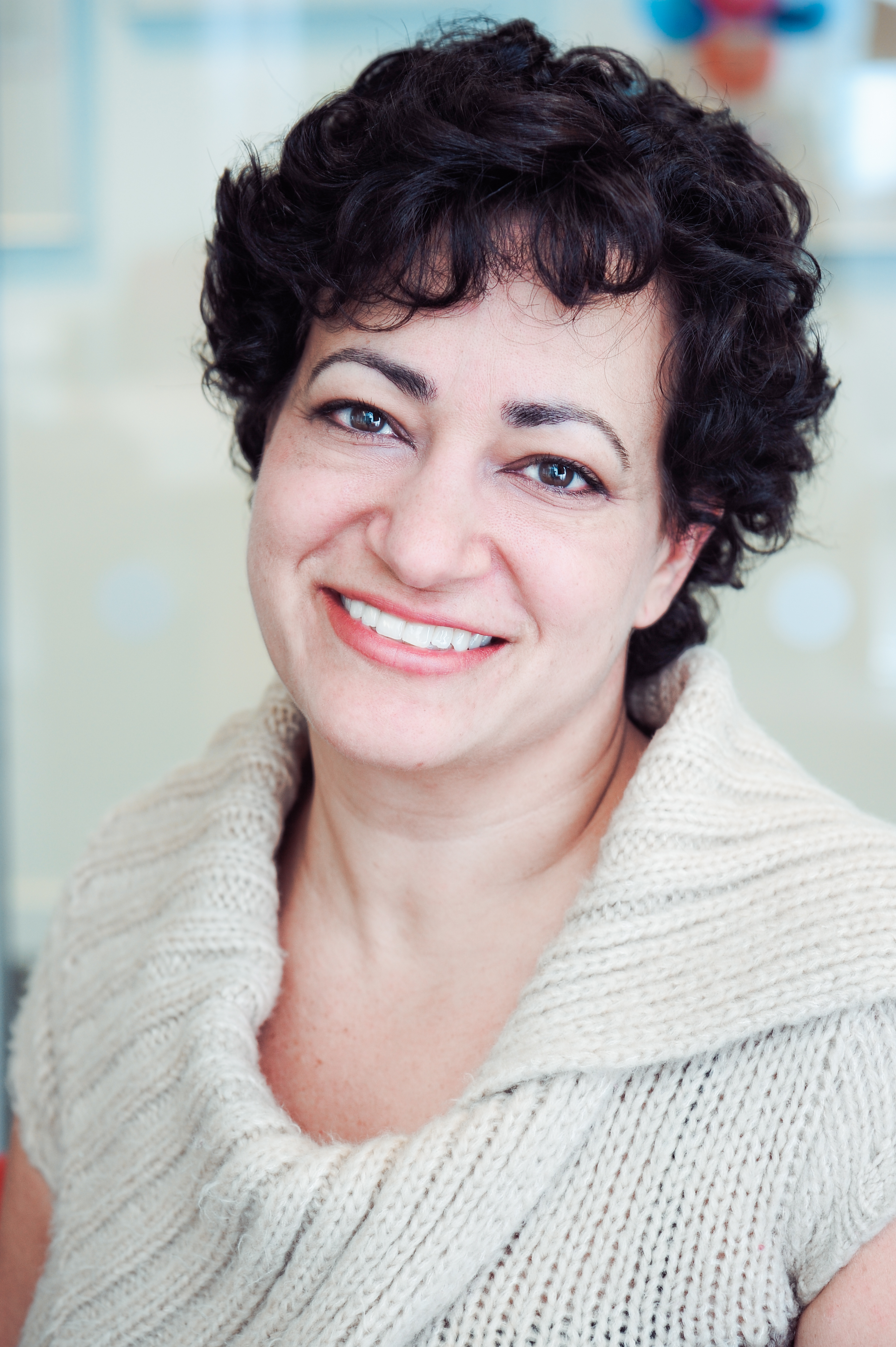
- Silber in 2010
- Education: Oxford University's Saïd Business School; Vanderbilt University; Haverford College
- Occupations: Board member, Canonical Ltd.
- Known for: CEO, Canonical Ltd, 2010–2017

Jane Silber is a board member of Canonical Ltd. and was its chief executive officer from 2010 to 2017. Silber is also the chair of the board of Diffblue (whose products include Cover, an AI-driven unit test-writing tool).

Silber joined Canonical in July 2004, where her work has included leading the Ubuntu One project and ensuring that large organizations find Ubuntu "enterprise-ready". She partially attributes the increasing attention to user research and design in open source since 2009 to Canonical's leadership in this area. Silber announced her transition out of the CEO role in April 2017, with Canonical founder Mark Shuttleworth resuming the position from July 2017.

Silber's earlier roles include Vice President of Interactive Television Company and Vice President of General Dynamics C4 Systems. She has also worked in Japan for Teijin Ltd conducting artificial intelligence research and product development, and in the US at General Health, a health risk assessment firm.

She holds an MBA degree from Oxford University's Saïd Business School, an MSc degree in Management of Technology from Vanderbilt University, where she concentrated on machine learning and artificial intelligence work, and a BSc degree in Mathematics and Computer Science from Haverford College.
