= Ozow =

Ozow, previously known as i-Pay, is a fintech company based in South Africa.

The company provides a variety of online payment services for South African businesses and consumers.

== History ==
Established in 2014, Ozow has headquarters in Johannesburg and Cape Town, South Africa. It was co-founded by Thomas Pays, Mitchan Adams, and Lyle Eckstein. Ozow has developed and currently operates an online automated Electronic Funds Transfer (EFT) payment gateway in South Africa.

Ozow is accessible to all who have an internet banking profile and allows for instant payments across all smart mobile and desktop devices. On March 5, 2020, the company achieved a milestone of R10 billion in transactions processed.

Amid the COVID-19 pandemic, the company experienced increased huge demand for their services as large numbers of South Africans turned to online purchases amidst widespread lockdowns.

In November 2020, the company processed R1 billion in transactions in the month, including over Black Friday. The single biggest transaction processed was R500,000.

=== Investments ===
Kalon Venture Partners invested in the company during early funding rounds of the business. In June 2019, Ozow raised follow-on funding from Kalon Venture Partners as part of a larger Series A round.

In November 2021, the company announced a $48 million Series B funding round led by Tencent. The investment round also included Endeavor Catalyst and Endeavor Harvest Fund. Notably, Endeavor Catalyst’s investment committee approval was chaired by Reid Hoffman, partner at Greycroft, and co-founder and former executive chairman of LinkedIn.

== Services ==
Ozow offers consumers card-free services whereby they are able to access their accounts using internet banking. Ozow uses a payment gateway to provide customers with payments. No registration is required and all customers need is an internet banking profile. Customers who pay through Ozow only pay the merchant. There are no other fees.

There are no charge backs on payments. Merchants receive payments directly from the customer's bank or credit accounts. Credit cards are not needed. Merchants also receive notifications of transactions.

The company offers online businesses, NGO's and non-profit organisations that process under R1 million in monthly transactions zero processing fees for 12 months.

In September 2020 the company released Ozapp, a web application that enables customers with a bank account or digital wallet facility to transact without a card, using a QR code payment. The company also released Ozow PIN, which simplifies EFT transactions using a four-step payment process.

In February 2022, Ozow partnered with another local payment provider, Zapper, to offer payment services on Zapper's mobile app.

In addition to its payment services, the company offers refunds and withdrawal services to business clients.

== Technology ==
Ozow is Thawte certified. Ozow provides network infrastructure for online payment processing for merchants and customers.

== Regulatory ==
Ozow is authorised as a System Operator and registered as a Third Party Payment Provider with the Payments Association of South Africa (PASA). Ozow applies PCI DSS security standards to its automated EFT platform.
