= Broadcom =

American semiconductor company

Broadcom Inc.

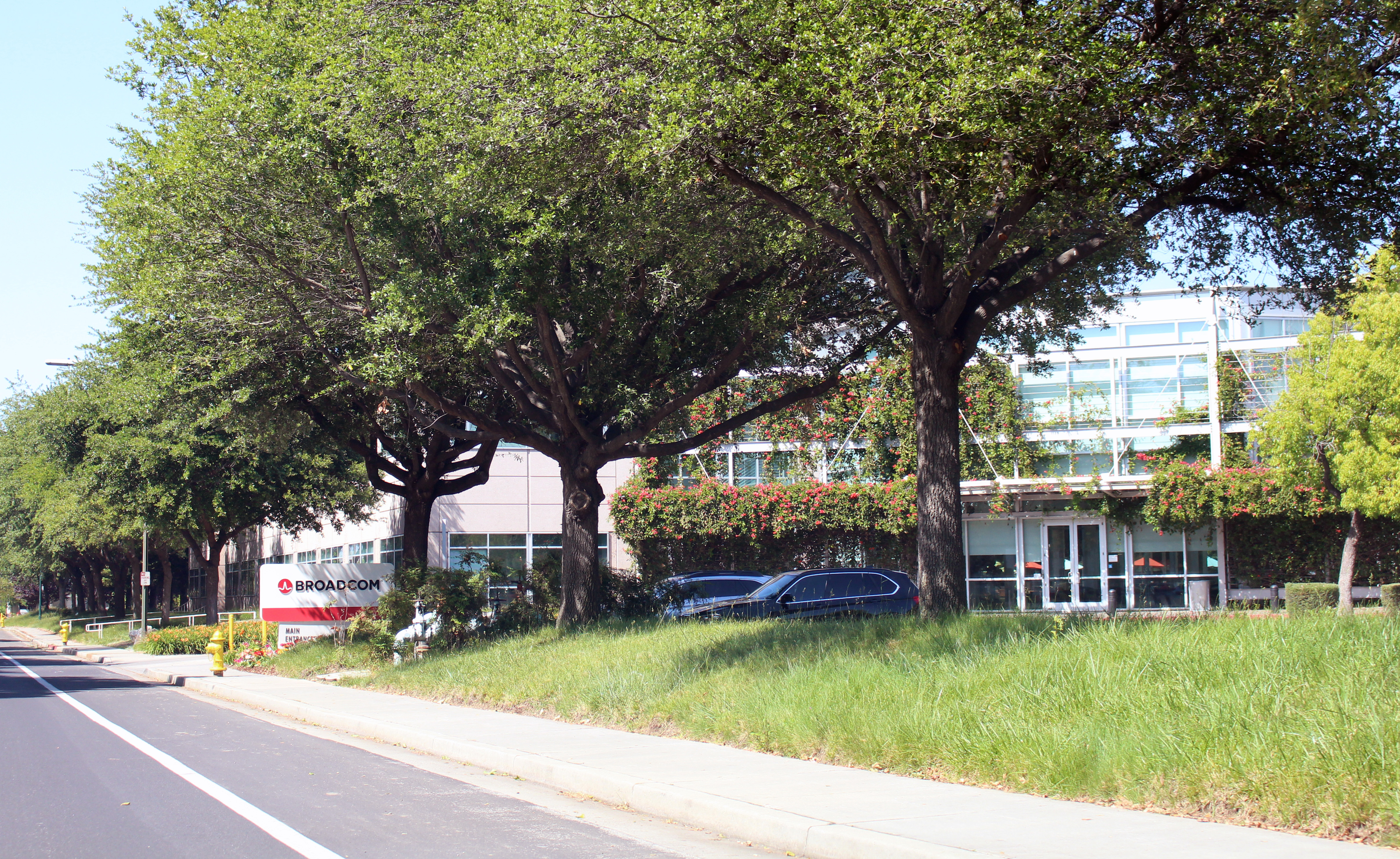
- Former headquarters in North San Jose
- Formerly: HP Associates (1961‍–‍1999); Agilent Semiconductor Products Group (1999‍–‍2005); Avago Technologies (2005‍–‍2016); Broadcom Limited (2016‍–‍2018)
- Type: Public
- Traded as: Nasdaq: AVGO; Nasdaq-100 component; S&P 100 component; S&P 500 component
- Industry: Semiconductor; Enterprise software; Computer hardware
- Founded: 1961; 65 years ago
- Headquarters: Stanford Research Park, Palo Alto, California, U.S.
- Key people: Henry Samueli (chairman); Hock Tan (president and CEO)
- Products: Custom ASICs / AI accelerators; Ethernet switches & NICs; Broadband & Wi-Fi SoCs; RF front end modules; Fibre Channel & storage controllers; VMware cloud infrastructure software; Symantec cybersecurity solutions; Mainframe & enterprise software
- Services: Enterprise software support; Cloud computing services; Professional IT & cybersecurity services
- Revenue: ▲US$63.89 billion (2025)
- Operating income: ▲US$25.48 billion (2025)
- Net income: ▲US$23.13 billion (2025)
- Total assets: ▲US$171.1 billion (2025)
- Total equity: ▲US$81.29 billion (2025)
- Number of employees: 33,000 (2025)
- Subsidiaries: VMware; CA Technologies; Symantec Enterprise; Brocade Communications Systems; LSI Corporation
- Website: broadcom.com

Broadcom Inc. is an American multinational designer, developer, manufacturer, and global supplier of a wide range of semiconductor and infrastructure software products. Broadcom's product offerings serve the data center, networking, software, broadband, wireless, storage, and industrial markets. As of 2026, Broadcom is one of the largest companies globally.

In December 2024, Broadcom became the 12th company to surpass a $1 trillion market cap. In April 2026, Broadcom surpassed a $2 trillion market cap, becoming the sixth company in history to do so. As of 2025, some 58% of Broadcom's revenue came from its semiconductor-based products and 42% from its infrastructure software products and services.

Tan Hock Eng is the company's president and CEO. The company is headquartered in Palo Alto, California. Avago Technologies Limited changed its name to Broadcom to acquire Broadcom Corporation in January 2016. Avago's ticker symbol AVGO now represents the merged entity. The Broadcom Corporation ticker symbol BRCM was retired. Initially the merged entity was known as Broadcom Limited, before assuming the current name in November 2017.

In October 2019, the European Union issued an interim antitrust order against Broadcom concerning anticompetitive business practices which allegedly violate European Union competition law.

In May 2022, Broadcom announced an agreement to acquire VMware in a cash-and-stock transaction valued at $69 billion. The acquisition was closed on November 22, 2023.

== History ==
=== Origin in Hewlett-Packard ===
The company that would later become Broadcom Inc. was established in 1961 as HP Associates, a semiconductor products division of Hewlett-Packard.

The division separated from Hewlett-Packard as part of the Agilent Technologies spinoff in 1999.

=== Formation of Avago Technologies ===
Logo of Avago Technologies

KKR and Silver Lake Partners acquired the Semiconductor Products Group of Agilent Technologies in 2005 for $2.6 billion and formed Avago Technologies. Avago Technologies agreed to sell its I/O solutions unit to PMC-Sierra for $42.5 million in October 2005.

In August 2008, the company filed an initial public offering of $400 million. In October 2008, Avago Technologies acquired Infineon Technologies' Munich-based bulk acoustic wave business for €21.5 million.

On 6 August 2009, Avago Technologies went public on NASDAQ with the ticker symbol AVGO.

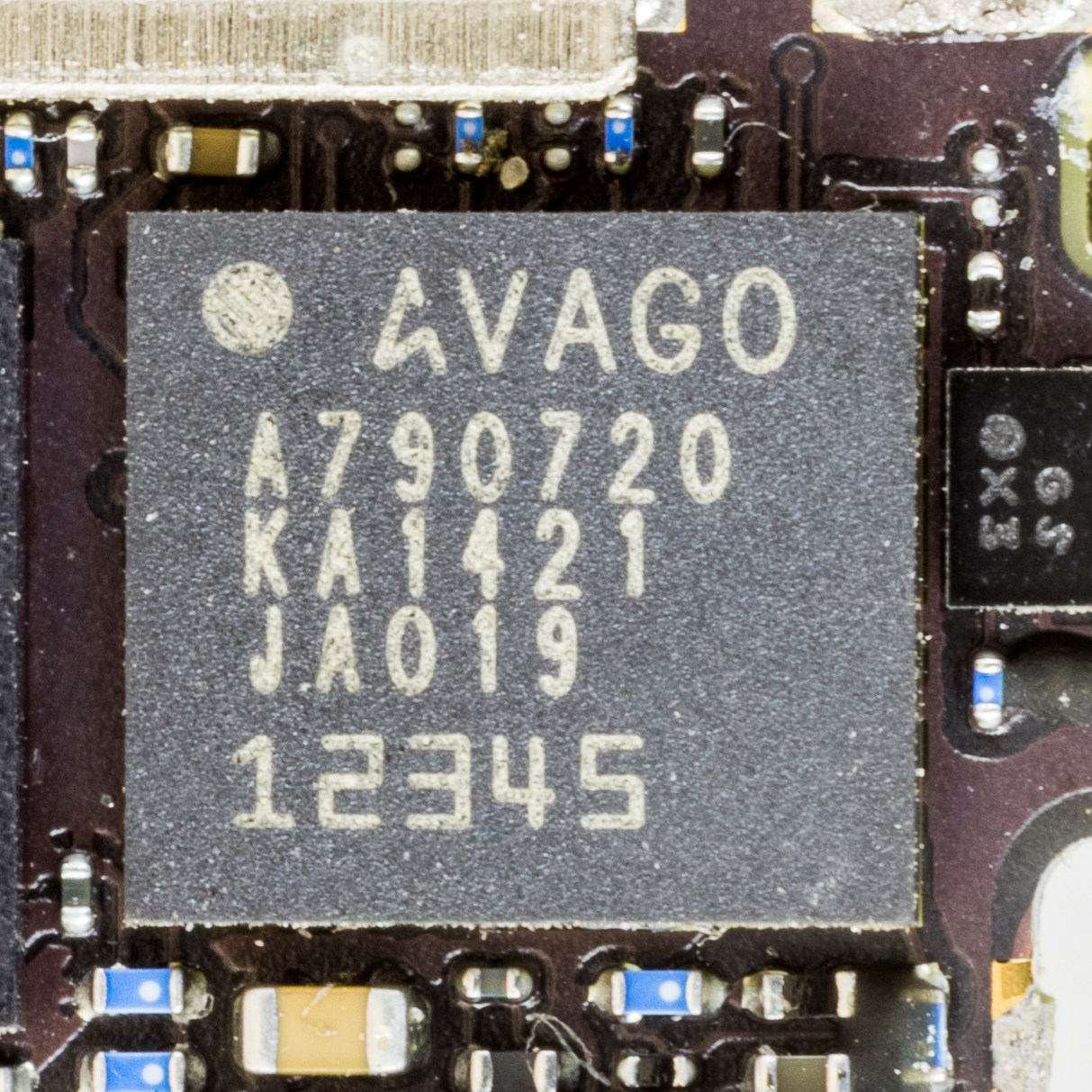
Avago chip inside an iPhone 5s

Avago Technologies announced its agreement to acquire CyOptics, an optical chip and component supplier, for $400 million in April 2013. The acquisition aimed to expand Avago Technologies' fiber optics product portfolio. In October 2013, Avago Technologies invested $5 million in Amantys, a power electronics technology provider, as part of a strategic investment agreement between the two companies.

Avago Technologies announced its agreement to acquire LSI Corporation in December 2013 for $6.6 billion. The acquisition helped move Avago Technologies away from specialized products and towards a more mainstream industry, which included chips, especially storage for data centers.

The company sold its SSD controller business to Seagate Technology in May 2014. In August 2014, the company was the ninth-largest semiconductor company. Avago Technologies agreed to sell LSI's Axxia Networking business to Intel for $650 million. The company also agreed to buy PLX Technology, an integrated circuits designer, for $309 million. In February 2015, it was announced that Avago Technologies Limited had reached an agreement to acquire Emulex Corporation for $8 per share in cash.

=== Acquisition of and change of name to Broadcom Limited ===
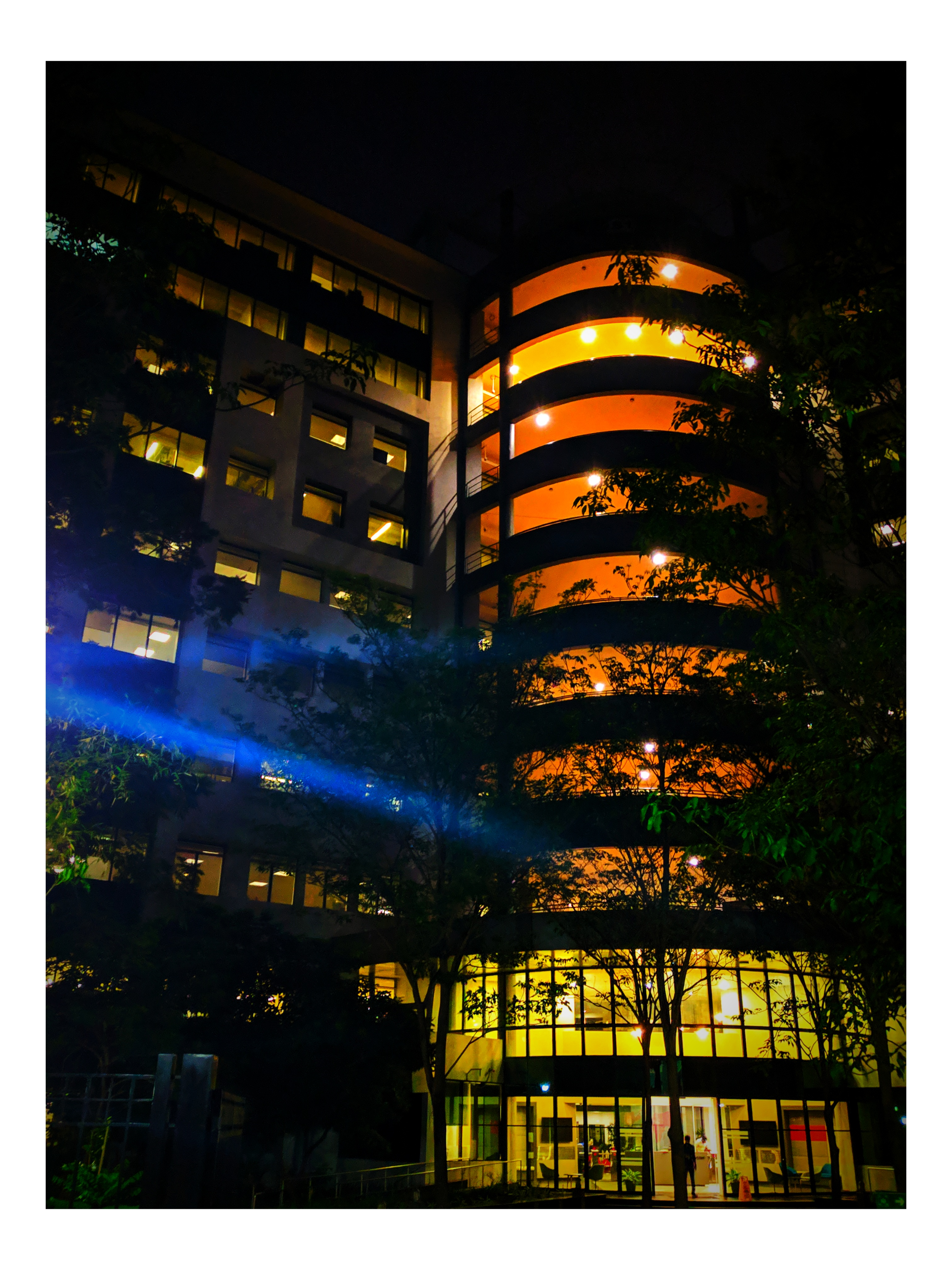
Broadcom facility in Bangalore, India, as seen in 2019

On 28 May 2015, Avago announced that it would buy Broadcom Corporation for $37 billion ($17 billion cash and $20 billion in shares). Avago was the nominal survivor, but the combined company would be named Broadcom Ltd. It would have annual revenue of $15 billion and a market value of $77 billion. Broadcom Corp. strengthened Avago Technologies' patent position significantly in sectors such as mobile, the data center, and the Internet of Things and made the company the ninth largest holder of patents among the top semiconductor vendors, according to an analysis by technology consulting firm LexInnova.

In May 2016, Cypress Semiconductor announced that it acquired Broadcom Corporation's full portfolio of IoT products for $550 million. Under the deal, Cypress acquired Broadcom's IoT products and intellectual property for Wi-Fi, Bluetooth and Zigbee connectivity, as well as Broadcom's WICED platform and SDK for developers. The deal combined Broadcom's developer tools and connectivity technologies for IoT devices with Cypress' own programmable system-on-a-chip (SoC) products that provide memory, computing and graphics processing for low-power devices.

=== Foreign investment reviews and change of name to Broadcom Inc. ===
In 2016, Broadcom proposed merging with Brocade Communications Systems. The acquisition proposal included a $5.5 billion price and was offered in cash. It was delayed for review by the Committee on Foreign Investment in the United States. On 2 November 2017, Broadcom announced it would relocate its legal address from Singapore to Delaware, which would avoid the review. This action was linked to the parent company being renamed from Broadcom Limited to Broadcom Inc. The pre-2016-merger Broadcom, Broadcom Corporation, remains a wholly owned subsidiary of the renamed parent Broadcom Inc.

In mid-November 2017, Broadcom proposed to purchase Qualcomm for US$130 billion, which was rebuffed by Qualcomm's board. The proposed hostile takeover, which was later revised to $117 billion, was blocked by the Trump administration by an executive order that cited national security concerns. Specifically, the Committee on Foreign Investment in the United States expressed concerns. Broadcom, then headquartered in Singapore, was considered too close to China and chipmaker Huawei. "A shift to Chinese dominance in 5G would have substantial negative national security consequences for the United States," CFIUS said. "While the United States remains dominant in the standards-setting space currently, China would likely compete robustly to fill any void left by Qualcomm as a result of this hostile takeover." However, critics of the move stated that the decision was motivated by competitiveness more than security concerns. Broadcom withdrew its takeover bid two days after the executive order. Observers have stated that President Trump's decision was as consistent with the balance of trade objectives as it was with security concerns.

=== Move into software ===
Historically a semiconductor-based-only company, the failure of the Qualcomm bid led Broadcom and its CEO to look at acquiring infrastructure software as an alternative way of growing in size. On 11 July 2018, news sources reported that Broadcom and CA Technologies agreed on terms for an $18.9 billion acquisition. CA Technologies, formerly known as Computer Associates, was a longtime giant in software for mainframe computers that had expanded its offerings into software for cloud computing. And on 5 November 2018, Broadcom announced that it had completed the acquisition of CA Technologies.

On 9 August 2019, Broadcom acquired the enterprise security business of Symantec Corporation (the consumer software portion of which is now known as Gen Digital) for $10.7 billion in cash. The deal continued Broadcom's push into software critical for corporate infrastructure. And on 4 November 2019, Broadcom announced that it had completed the acquisition of the business, as well as the Symantec name and brand.

In 2019, Broadcom was the fifth best performing publicly listed share of the 2010s, with a total return of 1,956%.

=== Anti-competitive practices investigations ===
In January 2018, it was reported that the FTC had been investigating Broadcom for several months for engaging in anti-competitive tactics while negotiating with customers. In 2021, Broadcom agreed to settle the antitrust complaint, in which the U.S. Federal Trade Commission claimed that the company abused its monopoly power using restrictive contract terms and threats of retaliation against customers the company deemed "disloyal."

In October 2019, Broadcom was ordered by the European Commission to stop allegedly anticompetitive practices. In 2021, Broadcom agreed to settle the antitrust complaint which claimed it had abused its monopoly power through restrictive contract terms and threats of retaliation against non-compliant customers. Such contract terms are alleged to stifle innovation and harm competition in the global supply market. European Competition Commissioner Margrethe Vestager said that Broadcom's contract terms with six main customers would "create serious and irreversible harm to competition" if no action were taken. The company agreed to a commitment to suspend agreements containing exclusivity or quasi-exclusivity arrangements and a commitment not to enter into such agreements for seven years.

Following its $69 billion acquisition of VMware in 2023, Broadcom faced renewed European regulatory scrutiny over its licensing of VMware products. In March 2026, the Cloud Infrastructure Service Providers in Europe (CISPE) trade group filed a formal complaint with the European Commission, alleging that Broadcom's licensing of VMware products to cloud service providers infringed EU antitrust rules and requesting interim measures to halt the closure of VMware's cloud service provider programme. CISPE alleged that since the acquisition, prices had risen tenfold, with payment demanded upfront and products bundled regardless of customer need. The European Commission confirmed it was assessing the complaint. Broadcom denied the allegations, stating CISPE was "an organisation funded by hyperscalers, which misrepresent the realities of the market".

=== Patent suits ===
In 2017, Broadcom filed patent suits against smart TV manufacturers. The U.S. International Trade Commission ruled in favor of the smart TV manufacturers.

In 2020, Broadcom sued Netflix over multiple patent infringements. Critics have argued that Broadcom is suing Netflix for being more successful, citing the declining number of traditional pay television subscribers due to the rise of streaming services. The Leichtman Research Group calculated that the largest pay TV providers in the U.S. – representing about 95% of the market – lost about 4,915,000 net video subscribers in 2019. Regular customers each pay $231 a year for their boxes, totaling almost $20 billion per year in profit for the cable industry.

=== 2020s ===
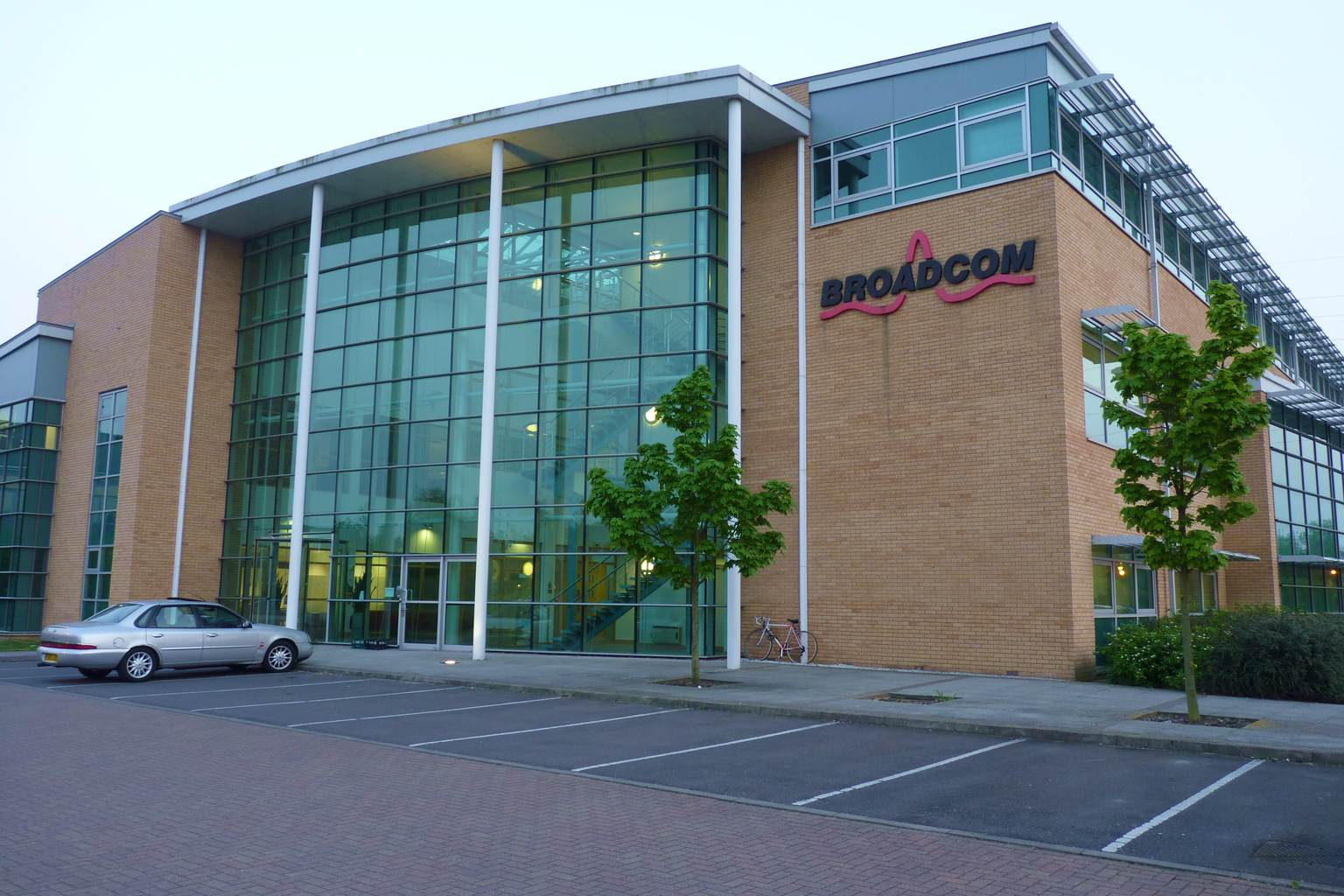
Broadcom office in Cambridge Science Park, April 2011.

On January 7, 2020, Accenture PLC agreed to acquire Symantec's 300-person cybersecurity services division from Broadcom. In February 2020, Broadcom announced the world's first WiFi 6E client device, the BCM4389. In early 2020, Raspberry Pi Inc. revealed that their new boards would have a Broadcom BCM2711 chip.

In May 2022, Broadcom announced its deal to acquire the virtualization and cloud computing software vendor VMware for $61 billion in a combination of cash and stock, with Broadcom assuming $8 billion in VMware debt. In November 2022, the UK's Competition and Markets Authority regulator announced it would investigate whether the Broadcom Inc. acquisition of VMware Inc. would "result in a substantial lessening of competition within any market or markets in the United Kingdom for goods or services". The European Commission also said it was investigating the proposed acquisition, and as a result, Broadcom and VMware extended the planned completion date out to May 26, 2023. On May 19, 2023, as both UK and EU regulators had yet to complete their investigations, the completion date was formally extended to August 26, 2023, and was later further extended to as late as November 26, 2023.

On November 21, 2023, Broadcom Inc. announced its plan to finalize the $69 billion acquisition of VMware Inc. on the following Wednesday. This acquisition, one of the largest in the technology sector, received global regulatory scrutiny, including from China, which approved the deal with specific conditions. These conditions require VMware's server software to be compatible with local hardware and not restrict customers to using Broadcom's hardware products. Despite concerns over rising China-U.S. tensions, the approval from China, which was the last regulatory hurdle, allowed the deal to proceed. The transaction closed on November 22, 2023. On completion, CEO Hock Tan announced that the company would relocate its headquarters in San Jose to the VMware campus in Palo Alto, California. In February 2024, Broadcom sold the end-user computing division, which it inherited from the VMware acquisition, to KKR for $4 billion.

In July 2026, Broadcom announced that it had extended its partnership with Apple through 2031 to develop and supply custom semiconductor products. Broadcom also supplied Apple with radio-frequency, Wi-Fi, Bluetooth and other networking components used in its devices.

== Corporate affairs ==
=== Finances ===
For the fiscal year 2025, Broadcom reported net income of US$23.1 billion and net revenue of US$63.9 billion, an increase of about 24% in revenue from the previous fiscal year.

Year	Revenue (US$ ml.)	Net income (US$ ml.)	Total assets (US$ ml.)	Employees
2009	1,484	(44)	1,970	3,200
2010	2,093	415	2,157	3,500
2011	2,336	552	2,446	3,500
2012	2,364	563	2,862	3,600
2013	2,520	552	3,415	4,800
2014	4,269	263	10,491	8,400
2015	6,824	1,364	10,515	8,200
2016	13,240	(1,739)	49,966	15,700
2017	17,636	1,692	54,418	14,000
2018	20,848	1,692	50,124	15,000
2019	22,597	2,695	67,493	19,000
2020	23,888	2,663	75,933	21,000
2021	27,450	6,437	75,570	20,000
2022	33,203	11,223	73,249	20,000
2023	35,819	14,082	72,861	20,000
2024	51,574	5,895	165,645	37,000
2025	63,887	23,126	171,092	33,000

== Products ==
Broadcom sells a range of semiconductor and infrastructure software applications that serve the data center (mainframes), networking, software, broadband, wireless, and storage and industrial markets. Common applications for its products include: data center networking, home connectivity, broadband access, telecommunications equipment, smartphones, base stations, data center servers and storage, factory automation, power generation and alternative energy systems, displays, and mainframe operations and management, and application software development.

Broadcom's core technologies and franchise products include networking devices, optical technologies, network interface controllers and data storage.

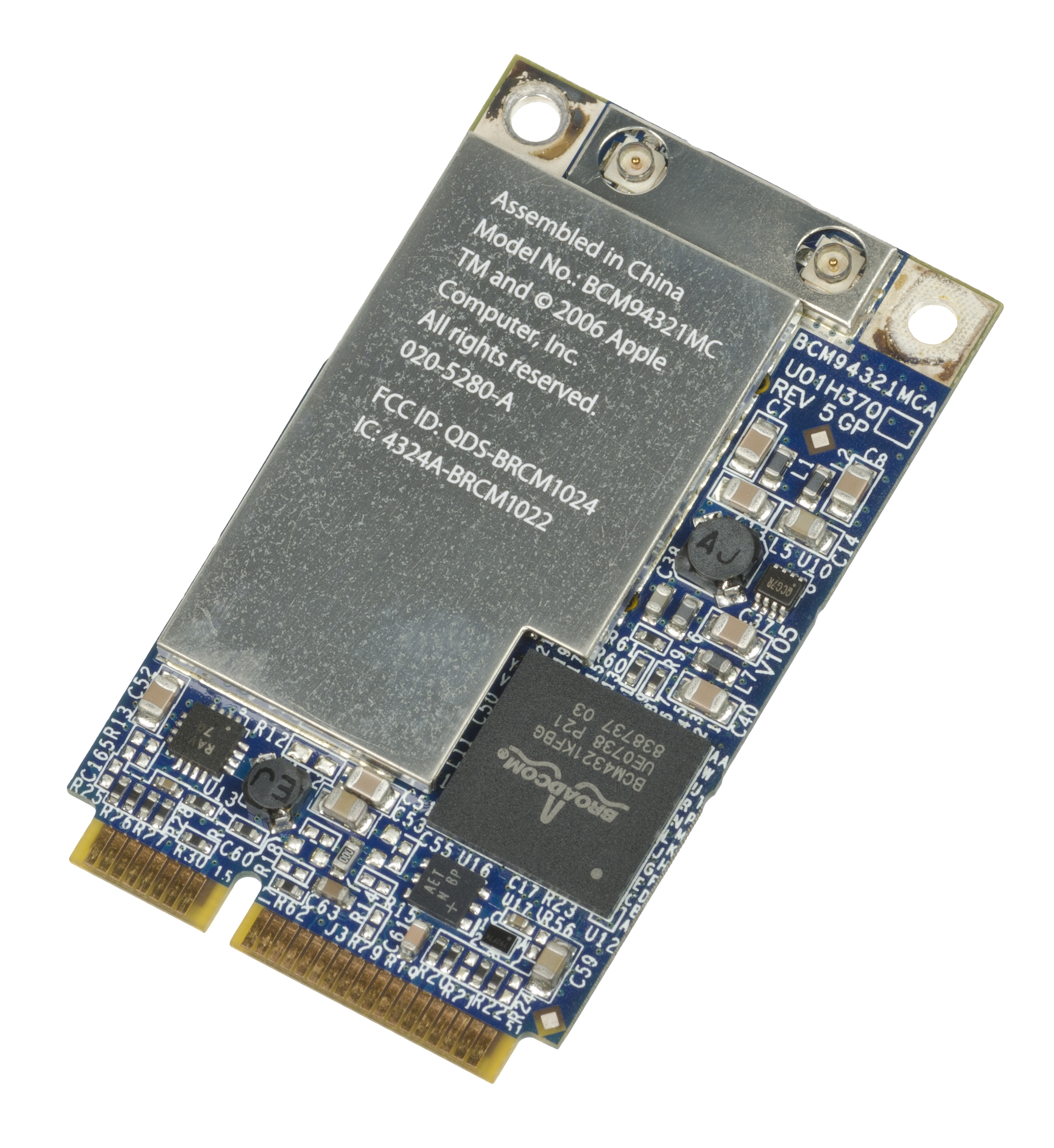
An Apple AirPort Extreme mini PCIe Wi-Fi card that uses a Broadcom chip

Vendors have included Broadcom NICs in their products. For example, select Dell PowerEdge blade servers have Broadcom-powered Ethernet port adapters as an add-in card. Other vendors such as Apple, Hewlett Packard Enterprise, and Raspberry Pi also use Broadcom NICs.

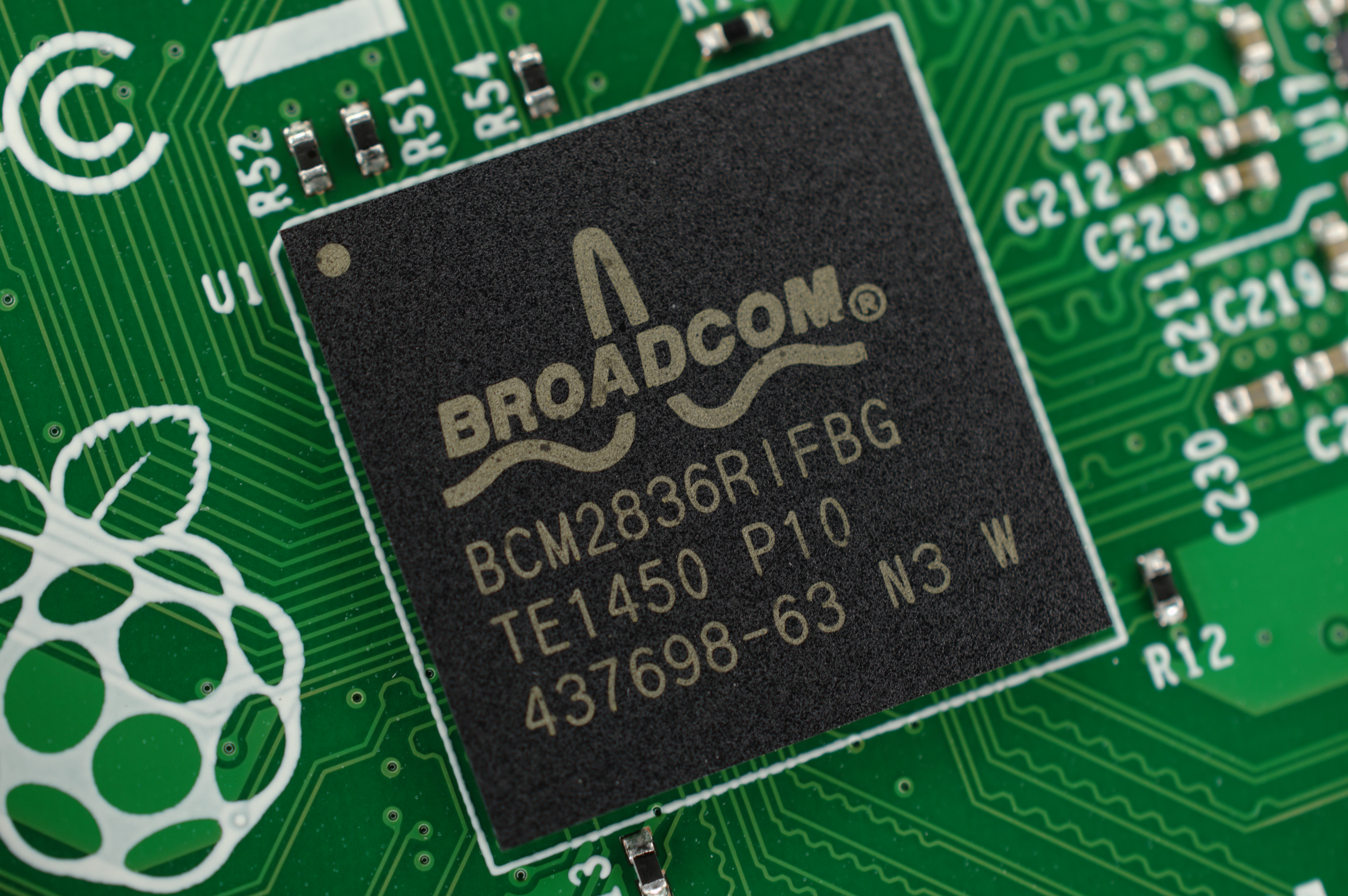
A system on a chip from Broadcom in a Raspberry Pi

=== Vulnerabilities in SoC WiFi stack ===
In April 2017, Google's Project Zero investigated Broadcom's SoC WiFi stack and found that it lacked "all basic exploit mitigations - including stack cookies, safe unlinking and access permission protection," allowing "full device takeover by Wi-Fi proximity alone, requiring no user interaction." Numerous smartphones, such as by Apple, Samsung and Google were affected.

=== Jericho2 ===
Jericho2 is a programmable Ethernet switch chip that has up to 10 Tbit/s switching capacity per device. The networking chip's latest iteration, Jericho4, is designed to link data centers situated more than 60 miles apart and is seen as critical in AI computation.

=== Tomahawk 3 ===
Tomahawk 3 series supports high-density, standards-based 400GbE, 200GbE, and 100GbE switching and routing for hyperscale cloud networks. Broadcom divulged that it is bringing two variants of the Tomahawk-3 to market. The first can provide up to 12.8 Tbit/s total chip bandwidth and contains 256 integrated SerDes, supporting 32 ports at 400 Gbit/s, 64 ports at 200 Gbit/s, and 128 ports at 100 Gbit/s. The second variant of the Tomahawk-3 has 160 of the 256 SerDes available and delivers 8 Tbit/s of aggregate bandwidth. Broadcom is suggesting 80 ports at 100 Gbit/s; or 48 ports at 100 Gbit/s plus either 8 ports at 400 Gbit/s or 16 ports at 200 Gbit/s; or 96 ports at 50 Gbit/s plus either 8 ports at 400 Gbit/s or 16 ports at 200 Gbit/s. The Tomahawk 4 reached a speed of 25.6 Tbit/s while the Tomahawk 5 has a maximum speed of 51.2 Tbit/s. The most recent Tomahawk 6 technology features industry-leading 102.4 Tbps single-chip Ethernet switch.

=== Software ===
Broadcom has expanded from its original hardware base and also offers enterprise software products.

==== Symantec Enterprise Security ====
Broadcom operates its enterprise security business under the Symantec brand. It purchased the suite of enterprise security products from Symantec Corporation in 2019, after which Symantec Corporation changed its name to NortonLifeLock.

==== BizOps technology ====
Broadcom also offers products for supporting BizOps, including:

- Clarity – product portfolio management
- Rally – agile development
- Blaze CT – Shift-left testing
- DX Operational Intelligence – AIOps
- Agile Requirements Designer – model-based testing optimization of processes

=== XPU ===
Broadcom uses the term XPU to refer to custom ASIC chips developed in collaboration with major hyperscale clients—such as Google, Meta Platforms and ByteDance—that are tailored for specialized AI workloads.

Broadcom has co-developed Google's Tensor Processing Unit (TPU) chips by translating Google's architecture and specifications into manufacturable silicon, providing proprietary technologies like SerDes high-speed interfaces, overseeing ASIC design, and managing chip fabrication and packaging through third-party foundries such as TSMC, covering all generations since the program's inception. Similarly, Meta's Training and Inference Accelerator (MTIA) chips, first introduced in 2023, were co-developed by Broadcom. In 2024, Broadcom began collaborating with OpenAI to co-develop a custom inference chip, as part of an effort to diversify beyond reliance on Nvidia GPUs amid growing demand.
