= DigiCert =

Internet security company

DigiCert, Inc.
- Type: Private
- Industry: Internet security, Public key infrastructure, IoT security
- Founded: 2003; 23 years ago
- Headquarters: Lehi, Utah, U.S.
- Number of locations: 12
- Area served: Worldwide
- Key people: Amit Sinha (CEO); Jason Sabin (CTO); Jugnu Bhatia (CFO); Dave Packer (CRO); Deepika Chauhan (CPO; Lakshmi Hanspal (CTrO))
- Number of employees: 2,000+
- Website: www.digicert.com

DigiCert, Inc. is a digital security company that operates as a certificate authority and provides SaaS solutions for public key infrastructure (PKI) and certificate lifecycle management. Its offerings support authentication, encryption, and identity verification for systems, software, devices, and networks.

== History ==
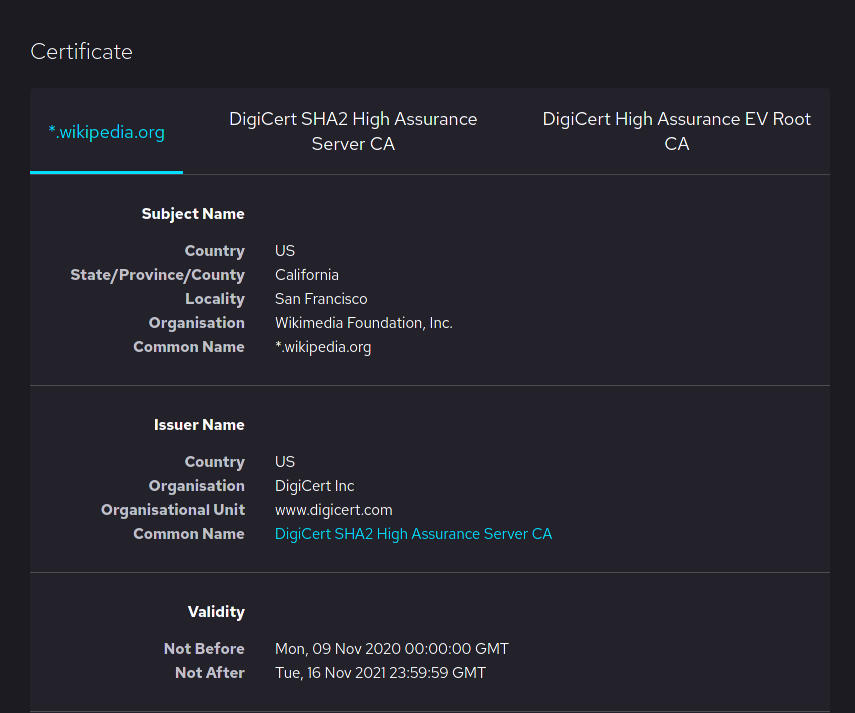
Example of a DigiCert issued wildcard certificate for *.wikipedia.org

DigiCert was founded by Ken Bretschneider in 2003. In 2005, DigiCert became a founding member of the CA/Browser Forum.

In 2007, DigiCert and Microsoft developed the first multi-domain (SAN) certificate. In 2012, Nicholas Hales was named the CEO of DigiCert.

In 2015, DigiCert acquired the CyberTrust Enterprise SSL business from Verizon Enterprise Solutions. Following the acquisition, DigiCert expanded its extended validation (EV) business.

In August 2015, private equity firm Thoma Bravo acquired a majority stake in DigiCert, with TA Associates holding a minority share. In 2016, John Merrill was named CEO of DigiCert.

In 2017, DigiCert acquired the TLS/SSL and PKI businesses from Symantec, including brands GeoTrust, Rapid SSL (part of GeoTrust), Thawte and Verisign The acquisition resulted from questions first raised in 2015 by web browsers Google and Mozilla about the authenticity of certificates issued by Symantec, which represented one-third of all TLS/SSL certificates on the web. In September 2017, Google and Mozilla announced they would "reduce, and ultimately remove, trust in Symantec's Root Keys in order to uphold user's security and privacy when browsing the web".

The final distrust deadline for certificates chaining to Symantec roots was set for October 2018. Symantec agreed to transfer its certificate business to its top TLS/SSL competitor, DigiCert, whose roots were trusted by browsers. In December 2017, DigiCert began issuing free replacements for all distrusted certificates from Symantec, GeoTrust, RapidSSL, Thawte, and VeriSign. By Oct. 2018, the company had revalidated more than 550,000 organizational identities and issued more than 5 million replacement certificates for affected customers.

In 2018, DigiCert acquired QuoVadis, a trust service provider headquartered in Switzerland offering qualified digital certificates, PKI services, and PrimoSign electronic signature software. Qualified digital certificates from QuoVadis (now backed by DigiCert) comply with eIDAS, a set of EU standards for electronic transactions requiring legal proof of authentication. The company operates as a Qualified Trust Service Provider in Belgium, the Netherlands, and Switzerland. According to DigiCert, "the QuoVadis acquisition aligns with the company's vision of providing globally dispersed and robust PKI-based solutions with local support."

In 2019, the company announced a new R&D division called DigiCert Labs. DigiCert Labs will collaborate with other enterprise labs – including Microsoft Research, Utimaco, ISARA, and Gemalto – and make grants to universities for the study of topics related to authentication, data integrity, encryption and identity. Initial research projects will focus on post-quantum cryptography and machine learning. In 2019, DigiCert also launched a post-quantum computing tool kit.

In 2019, Clearlake Capital Group, L.P., a leading private investment firm, and TA Associates, an existing investor, reached an agreement to make a strategic growth investment in DigiCert. As part of the transaction, Clearlake, and TA Associates become equal partners in the company.

In January 2022, DigiCert acquired IoT security company Mocana. In June 2022, the company acquired DNS Made Easy, a DNS services provider.

In October 2022, DigiCert named Dr. Amit Sinha as CEO and board member. Amit had previously led technology and innovation at the cloud-security company Zscaler the previous 12 years.

In September 2024 DigiCert acquired Vercara, which previously was Neustar Security Services.

In July 2024, DigiCert revoked over 83,000 certificates due to failures in domain control validation (DCV), affecting approximately 0.4% of its active certificates. The scale and impact of the incident led to criticism from industry observers, who argued that it reflected broader concerns about DigiCert’s operational reliability and compliance practices.

In September 2025, DigiCert acquired Valimail, a provider of zero trust email authentication delivered as a service. DigiCert was also selected to operate the ASC X9 PKI providing PKI solutions for the financial industry.

=== Acquisitions ===
Year	Acquisition
2015	Verizon's SSL/TLS business
2017	Symantec's website security and PKI solutions, including the GeoTrust, RapidSSL, Thawte, and VeriSign brands
2019	QuoVadis (Switzerland)
2022	Mocana
2022	DNS Made Easy and Constellix
2024	Vercara
2025	Valimail

== Products ==
DigiCert ONE is a cloud-based platform developed by DigiCert for managing public key infrastructure (PKI), digital certificates, and related trust services. The platform is used for certificate issuance, automation, and lifecycle management across enterprise applications, networks, and connected devices.
