= Cloud-init =

Configuration software by Canonical Ltd.

cloud-init
- Repository: github.com/canonical/cloud-init
- Website: cloud-init.io

cloud-init is a software tool developed by Canonical. It is used for doing the initial setup of virtual machines in cloud computing.
