= Mark Shuttleworth =

South African entrepreneur and space tourist (born 1973)

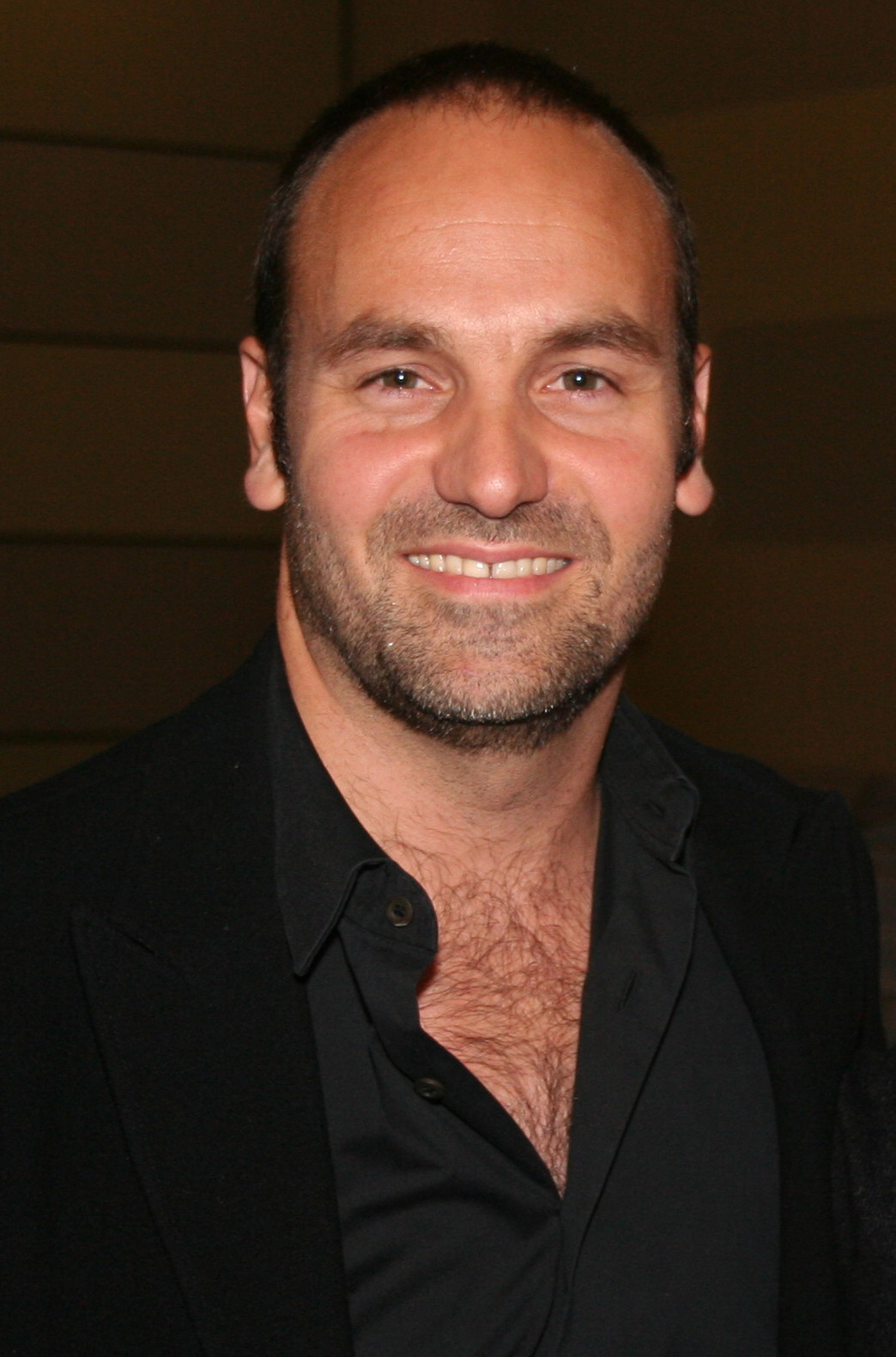
- Shuttleworth in Dublin, 2011
- Born: Mark Richard Shuttleworth; 18 September 1973 (age 53); Welkom, Orange Free State, South Africa
- Citizenship: South Africa; United Kingdom
- Occupation: Entrepreneur
- Space career

Space Adventures Tourist
- Time in space: 9d 21h 25m
- Mission: Soyuz TM-34/TM-33
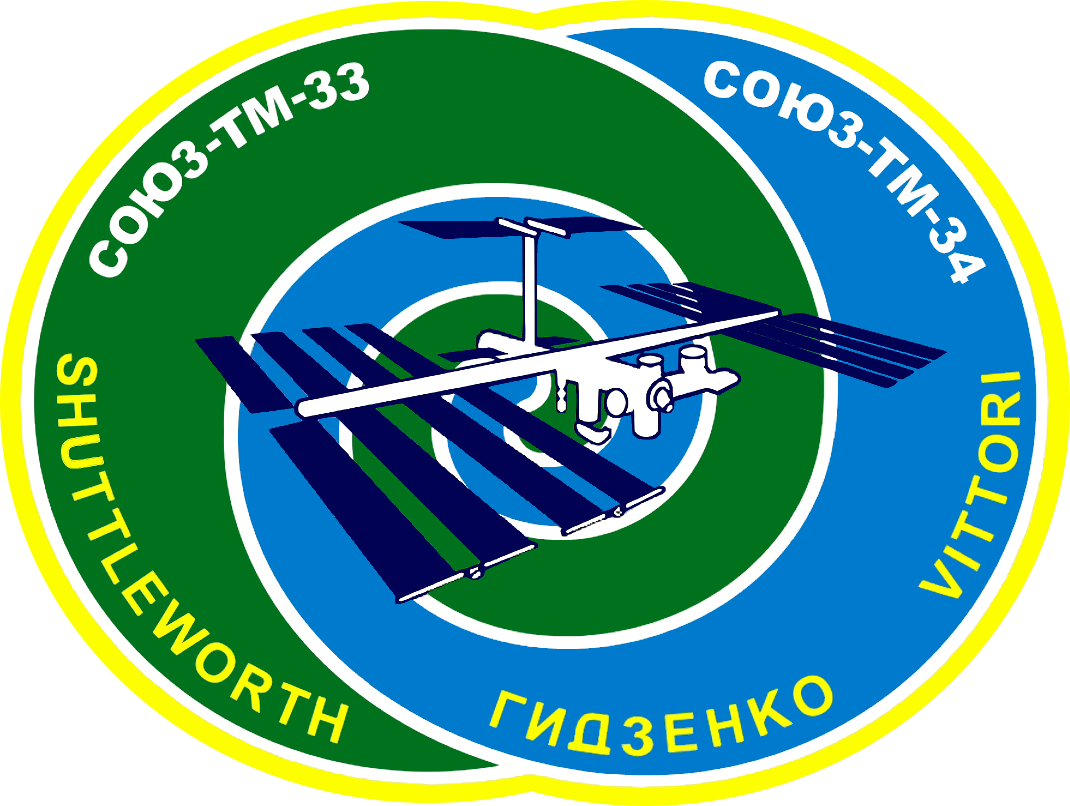
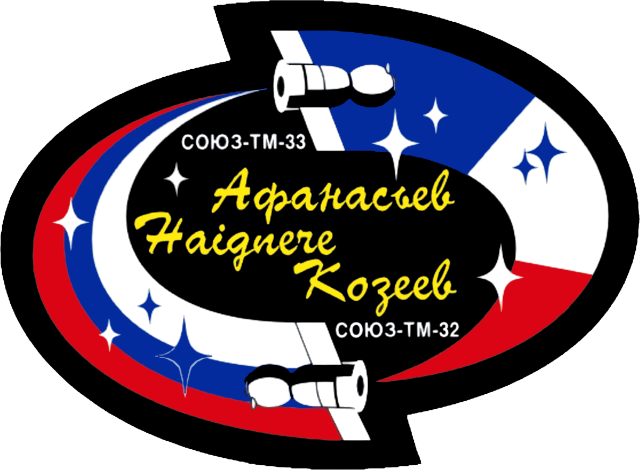
- Mission insignia
- Website: www.markshuttleworth.com

Mark Richard Shuttleworth (born 18 September 1973) is a South African and British entrepreneur, founder and CEO of Canonical, the company behind the Linux operating system variant Ubuntu. In 2002, Shuttleworth became the first African to travel to space, doing so as a space tourist. He holds dual citizenship from South Africa and the United Kingdom. In 2020, the Sunday Times Rich List estimated Shuttleworth's net worth to be £500 million.

== Early life ==
Shuttleworth was born in Welkom, Free State, South Africa, to a surgeon and a nursery-school teacher. He attended Western Province Preparatory School (where he became Head Boy in 1986), followed by one term at Rondebosch Boys' High School, and then Bishops/Diocesan College where he was Head Boy in 1991. Shuttleworth obtained a Bachelor of Business Science degree in Finance and Information Systems at the University of Cape Town. As a student, he was involved in the installation of the university's first residential Internet connections. Since childhood, Mark Shuttleworth had a dream of becoming a cosmonaut and flying into space.

== Work ==
In 1995, Shuttleworth founded Thawte Consulting, a company specialising in digital certificates and Internet security. According to The Official Ubuntu Book, Thawte became the second-largest certificate authority after VeriSign. Shuttleworth sold Thawte to VeriSign in December 1999, earning him R3.5 billion (US$575 million, equivalent to $1043 million in 2025).

In September 2000, Shuttleworth formed HBD Venture Capital (Here be Dragons), a business incubator and venture capital provider, now managed by Knife Capital. In March 2004 he formed Canonical Ltd., to promote and commercially support free software projects, especially the Ubuntu operating system. In December 2009, Shuttleworth stepped down as CEO of Canonical Ltd. to focus on "product design, partnerships, and customers", with COO Jane Silber succeeding him. Shuttleworth returned to the position of CEO of Canonical in July 2017, with Silber moving to Canonical's board of directors.

== Linux and FOSS ==
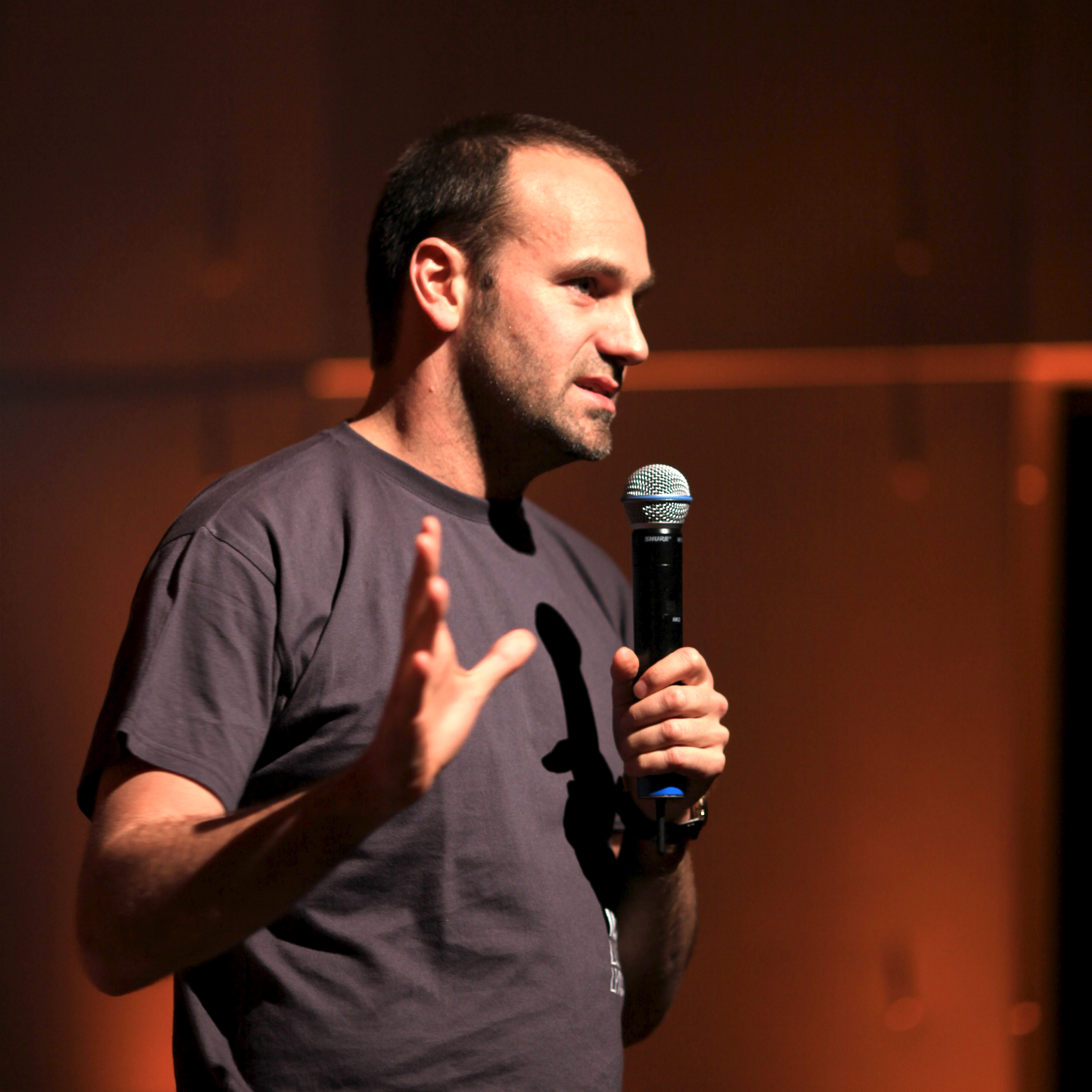
Shuttleworth speaking in 2009

In the 1990s, Shuttleworth participated as a developer of the Debian operating system. According to the Official Ubuntu Book, he was the first to upload the Apache HTTP Server "into the Debian project's archives".

In 2001, he formed the Shuttleworth Foundation, a nonprofit organisation dedicated to social innovation and funding educational, free, and open source software projects in South Africa, such as the Freedom Toaster.

In 2004, he returned to the free-software world by funding the development of Ubuntu, a Linux distribution based on Debian, through his company, Canonical Ltd.

In 2005, he founded the Ubuntu Foundation and made an initial investment of US$10 million. In the Ubuntu project, Shuttleworth is often referred to with the tongue-in-cheek title "Self-Appointed Benevolent Dictator for Life" (SABDFL). While travelling to Antarctica aboard the icebreaker Kapitan Khlebnikov in early 2004, Shuttleworth took six months of Debian mailing list archives with him to compile a list of potential hires for the project. In September 2005, he purchased a 65% stake of Impi Linux.

On 15 October 2006, Mark Shuttleworth became the first patron of KDE, the highest level of commercial sponsorship available. This relationship and financial support for Kubuntu (an Ubuntu variant using KDE as the main desktop) ended in 2012. Canonical is a patron of KDE since 2016.

On 17 December 2009, Shuttleworth announced that, effective March 2010, he would step down as CEO of Canonical to focus on product design, partnerships, and customers. Jane Silber, COO since 2004, succeeded him as CEO.

In September 2010, he received an honorary degree from the Open University for this work.

On 9 November 2012, Shuttleworth and Kenneth Rogoff debated with Garry Kasparov and Peter Thiel at the Oxford Union in a debate entitled "The Innovation Enigma".

On 25 October 2013, Shuttleworth and Ubuntu received the Austrian anti-privacy Big Brother Award for sending local Ubuntu Unity Dash searches to Canonical servers by default. In 2012, Shuttleworth had defended the anonymisation method used. He later reversed the decision; this feature is absent in current Ubuntu versions.

== Spaceflight ==
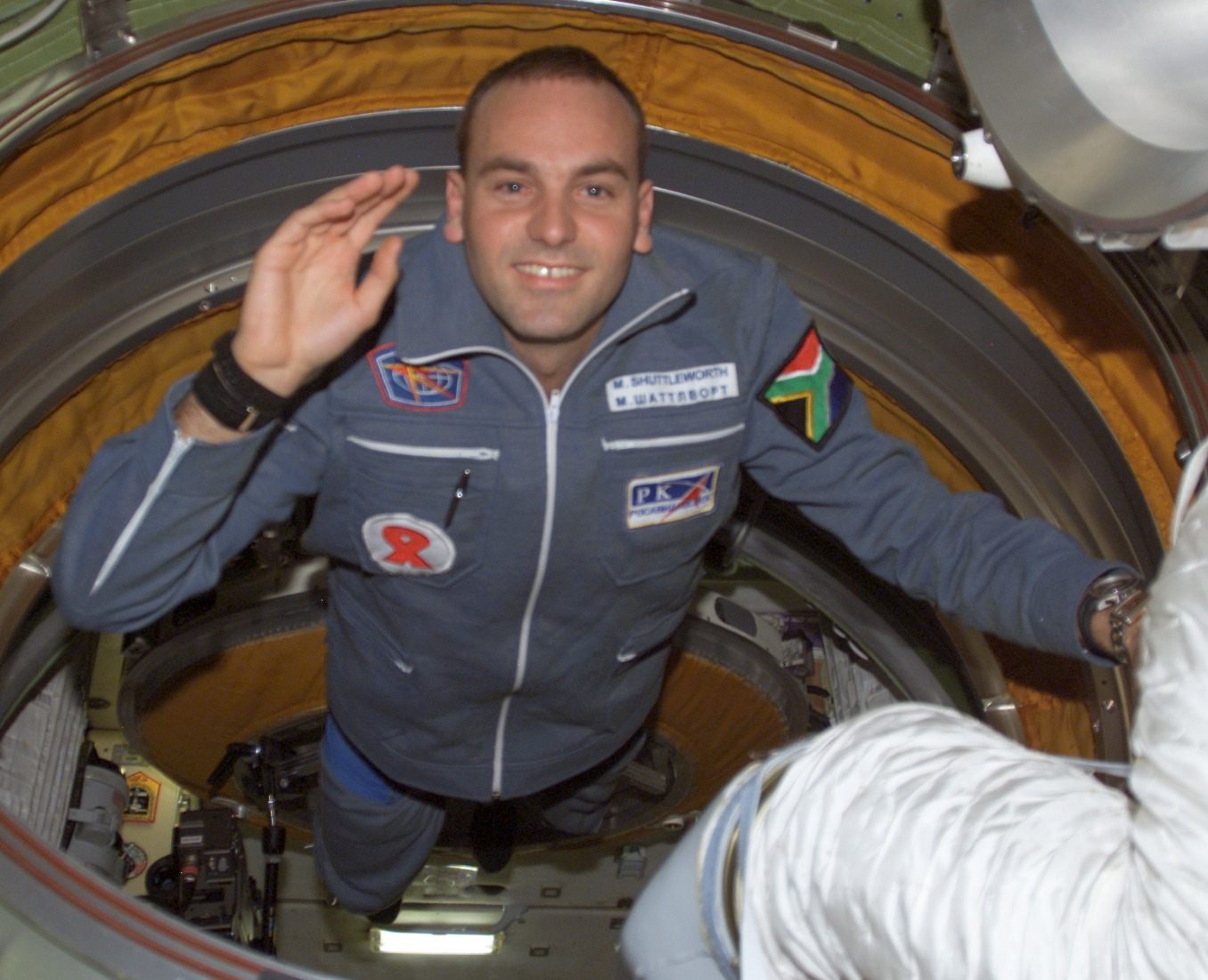
Shuttleworth on board the International Space Station

Shuttleworth gained international attention on 25 April 2002, becoming the second self-funded space tourist (after Dennis Tito in 2001) and the first South African in space. (Note: Shuttleworth is the first citizen of an independent African country to go into space. Patrick Baudry, an earlier astronaut, was also born in Africa; however, since Baudry's native Cameroon was a French colony at the time of his birth, he is considered a French citizen. Shuttleworth also had British citizenship at the time of his flight.) To participate in the flight, Shuttleworth underwent one year of training and preparation, including seven months in Star City, Russia,. He used to wake up at 6 o'clock in the morning to do special exercises. These included jogging around a very cold stadium in Star City while wearing shorts, a T-shirt, and a watch on each hand. One watch showed the time, while the other measured his pulse and heartbeat. From 9 o'clock in the morning to 6 o'clock in the evening, Mark studied the Russian language, because Russian skills were mandatory for flight conditions in the Russian spaceship he also did an interview with a popular Russian newspaper called Arguments and Facts. He told the Moscow journalist why he decided to fly into space on a Russian spaceship. He said, that Russia has a special program which gives opportunities for ordinary people to fly into space, but in America there's no such program. Flying through Space Adventures, he launched aboard the Russian Soyuz TM-34 mission as a spaceflight participant, paying approximately US$20 million for the voyage (equivalent to $34.17 million in 2025). Mark said that he did not pay to travel to space just for his dream but the Scientific Institute in the Republic of South Africa that had given him scientific experiments to carry out during the flight. Two days later, the Soyuz spacecraft arrived at the International Space Station, where he spent eight days participating in experiments related to AIDS and genome research. Mark performed those experiments successfully. On 5 May 2002, he returned to Earth on Soyuz TM-33.

From space, he spoke via video link to Thabo Mbeki, then president of South Africa, as part of the Freedom Day celebrations marking the end of apartheid.

He also had a radio conversation with Nelson Mandela and a 14-year-old South African girl, Michelle Foster, who asked him to marry her. He dodged the question, stating that he was "very honoured at the question" before changing the subject. The terminally ill Foster was provided the opportunity to have a conversation with Mark Shuttleworth and Nelson Mandela by the Reach for a Dream foundation.

== Transport ==
He owns a private jet, a Bombardier Global Express, often referred to as Canonical One but owned through his HBD Venture Capital company. The dragon depicted on the side of the plane is Norman, the HBD Venture Capital mascot.

== Legal clash with the South African Reserve Bank ==
When moving R2.5 billion in capital from South Africa to the Isle of Man, the South African Reserve Bank imposed a R250 million levy to release his assets. Shuttleworth successfully sued the Reserve Bank in the Supreme Court of Appeal to have the levy returned. However, on 18 June 2015, the Constitutional Court of South Africa reversed the lower courts' ruling, finding that the primary purpose of an exit charge was to regulate conduct rather than raise revenue. The court held "...that the exit charge was not inconsistent with the Constitution. The dominant purpose of the exit charge was not to raise revenue but rather to regulate conduct by discouraging the export of capital to protect the domestic economy."
