= Canonical (company) =

UK-based software company that maintains the Ubuntu OS

Canonical Ltd.
- Type: Private company limited by shares
- Industry: Computer software
- Founded: 5 March 2004; 22 years ago
- Founder: Mark Shuttleworth
- Headquarters: London, England, UK
- Area served: Worldwide
- Key people: Mark Shuttleworth (CEO); Neil French (COO); Jane Silber (board member)
- Products: Ubuntu; Launchpad; Bazaar
- Services: Landscape, Ubuntu Pro
- Revenue: ▲US$344.5 million (2025)
- Operating income: ▲US$12.1 million (2025)
- Net income: ▲US$22.8 million (2025)
- Total assets: ▲US$210.3 million (2025)
- Total equity: ▲US$33.8 million (2025)
- Number of employees: >607 (2025)
- Subsidiaries: Canonical Group Ltd; Canonical USA Inc. Canonical China Ltd (Chinese: 科能（上海）软件科技有限公司); Canonical Brasil Ltda; Canonical Canada Ltd; Canonical Ltd Taiwan Br. (Chinese: 英屬曼島商肯諾有限公司臺灣分公司)
- Website: canonical.com
- Footnotes; Formerly "M R S Virtual Development Ltd"

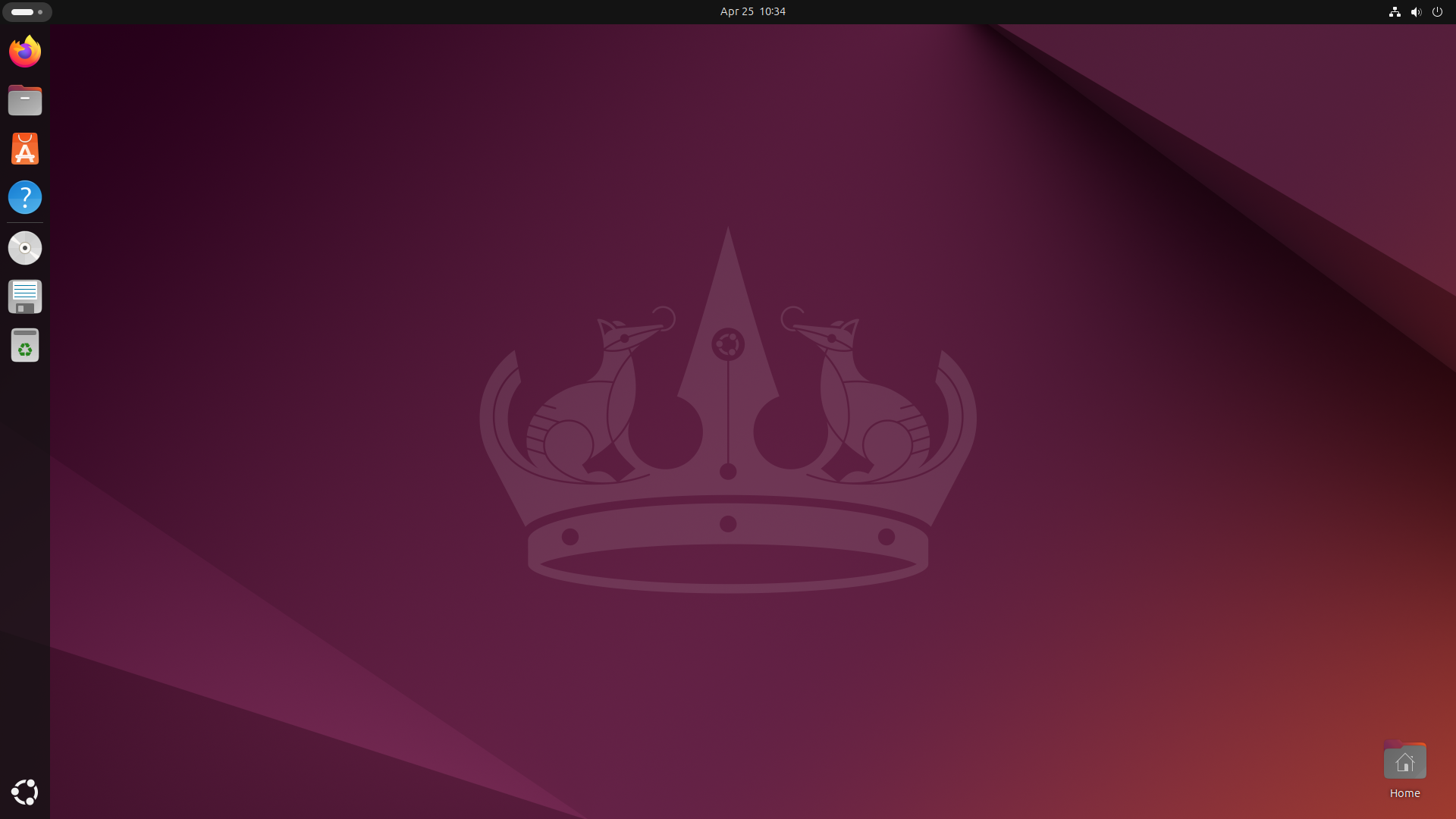
Ubuntu operating system, the company's main product

Canonical Ltd. is a privately held company supporting computer software, based in London, England. It was founded and funded by South African entrepreneur Mark Shuttleworth to market commercial support and related services for the operating system Ubuntu, and related projects. Canonical employs staff in more than 70 countries and maintains offices in London, Austin, Boston, Shanghai, Beijing, Taipei, Tokyo and the Isle of Man.

== Projects ==
Canonical Ltd. has created and continues to back several projects. Principally these are free and open-source software (FOSS) or tools designed to improve collaboration between free software developers and contributors. Some projects require a Contributor License Agreement to be signed.

=== Open-source software ===
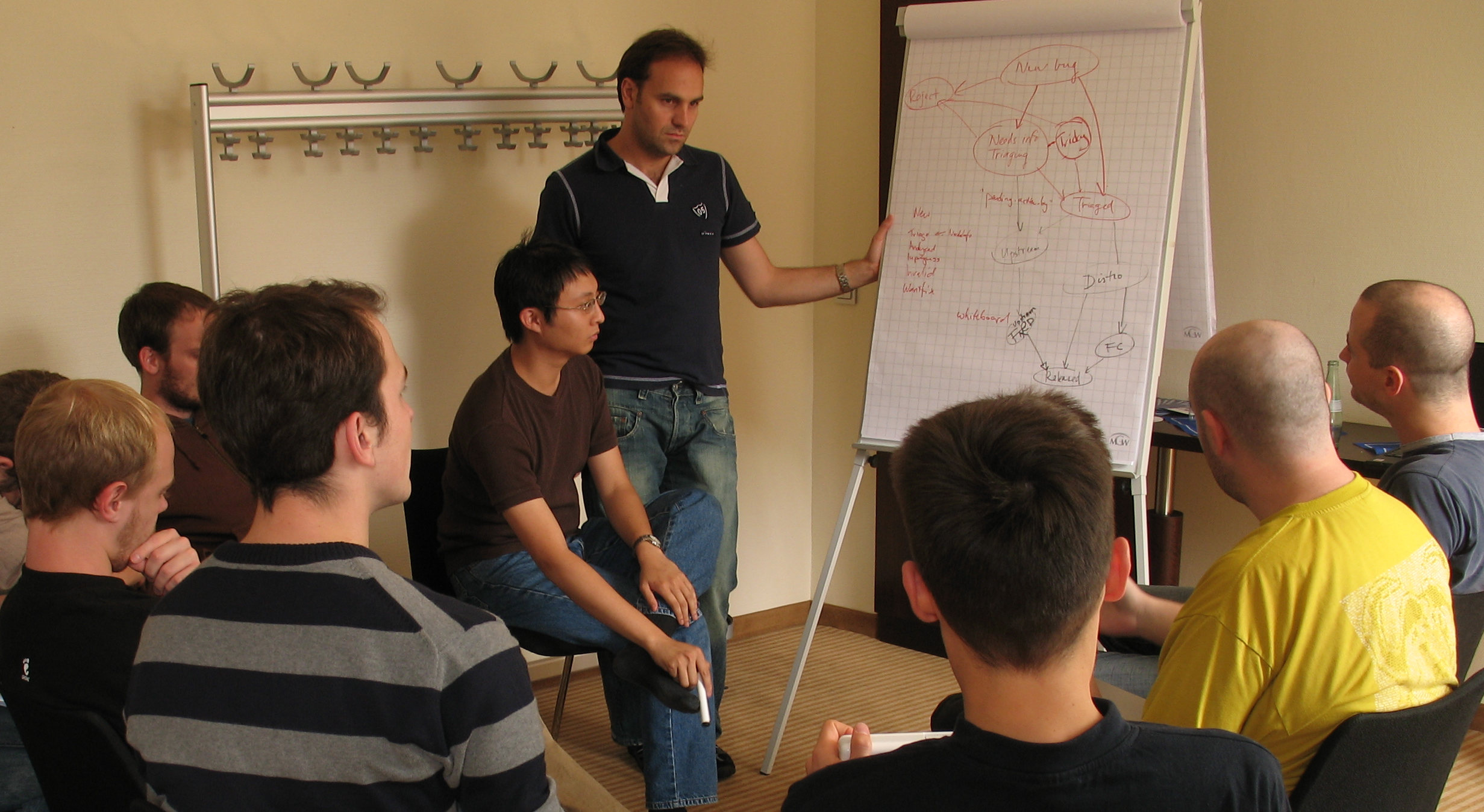
Mark Shuttleworth (standing) and other Canonical employees discuss Launchpad at a design sprint in Germany in 2006.

- Ubuntu, a Debian-based Linux distribution with GNOME (formerly with Unity) desktop
  - Ubuntu Core, a tiny and transactional version of Ubuntu
- GNU Bazaar, a decentralized revision control system
- Storm, an object-relational mapper for Python, part of the Launchpad code base
- Juju, a service orchestration management tool
- MAAS, a bare-metal server provisioning tool
- cloud-init, the de facto standard for the initial setup of virtual machines in the cloud
- U1DB, a cross-platform, cross-device, and syncable database application programming interface (API), allowing for applications to store JSON documents and synchronize them between machines and devices
- Upstart, a discontinued event-based replacement for the init daemon
- Quickly, a framework for creating software programs for Linux
- Ubiquity and Subiquity, operating system installers for Ubuntu
- Mir, a computer display server
- MicroK8s, an implementation of Kubernetes (since December 2018)
- Snap, a package management system for Ubuntu and other Linux operating systems
  - Snapcraft, a Python-based tool for packaging software
- Launchpad, a centralised website containing several component web applications designed to make collaboration between free software projects easier:
  - PPA, a special software repository for uploading software packages to be built and published as an APT repository,
  - Blueprints, a tool for planning features of software,
  - Code, a hosting of Bazaar branches,
  - Answers, a support tracker,
  - Rosetta, an online language translation tool to help localisation of software (cf. the Rosetta Stone),
  - Malone (as in "Bugsy Malone"), a collaborative bug-tracker that allows linking to other bug-trackers,
  - Soyuz, a tool for creating custom-distributions, such as Kubuntu and Xubuntu.

=== Other projects and services ===
- Landscape, a proprietary web service for centralized management of Ubuntu Linux systems
- Ubuntu One, a discontinued service since 2014 for file synchronization and other uses
- Ubuntu Pro, a commercial support service that covers Ubuntu and other Canonical products
- Multipass, launched in 2019, provides a command line interface to launch and manage virtual machine instances of Linux in Windows, macOS and Linux.
- Canonical Academy is a platform launched in October 2025 to provide practical, hands-on training and certification in Linux and Ubuntu administration.

=== Joint ventures ===
- Windows Subsystem for Linux, with Microsoft

== Business plans ==
In 2007, Canonical launched an International online shop selling support services and Ubuntu-branded goods; later in 2008 it expanded that with a United States-specific shop designed to reduce shipment times. At the same time, the word Ubuntu was trademarked in connection with clothing and accessories.

In a Guardian interview in May 2008, Shuttleworth said that Canonical's business model was service provision and that Canonical was not yet close to profitability. Canonical stated that it would wait three to five years to become profitable. Shuttleworth regarded Canonical as positioning itself as demand for services related to free software rose. This strategy has been compared to Red Hat's business strategies in the 1990s. In an early-2009 New York Times article, Shuttleworth said that Canonical's revenue was "creeping" towards US$30 million, the company's break-even point.

Canonical achieved a small operating profit of $281,000 in 2009, but until 2017 struggled to maintain financial solvency and took a major financial hit from the development of Unity and Ubuntu Touch, leading to an operating loss of $21.6 million for the fiscal year 2013. The company reported an operating profit of $2 million in 2017 after shutting down the Unity development team and laying off nearly 200 employees. The company now plans to focus on its server and professional support products and services, which have proved to be most profitable. Through this, Canonical plans to maintain solvency and achieve long-term profitability. In 2022, Canonical UK Limited (a subsidiary of the group) made a profit of £0.52m on revenues of £14.31m.

Canonical reported a revenue of $175M in 2021. In 2023, the company reported a revenue of $251M.

== Subsidiaries ==
- Canonical Group Ltd is located in London.
- Canonical USA Inc. is located in Boston, Massachusetts and Austin, Texas.
- Canonical China Ltd (Chinese: 科能（上海）软件科技有限公司 and 科能（上海）软件科技有限公司北京分公司) is located in Shanghai and Beijing.
- Canonical Ltd Taiwan Branch (Chinese: 英商科能有限公司台灣分公司) is located in Taipei.
- Canonical Limited is located in Isle of Man and Tokyo (Japan).
- Canonical Brasil Ltd is located in São Paulo (this office is no longer listed on their website).
- Canonical Canada Ltd is located in Montreal (the office is no longer in service).

== Employees ==
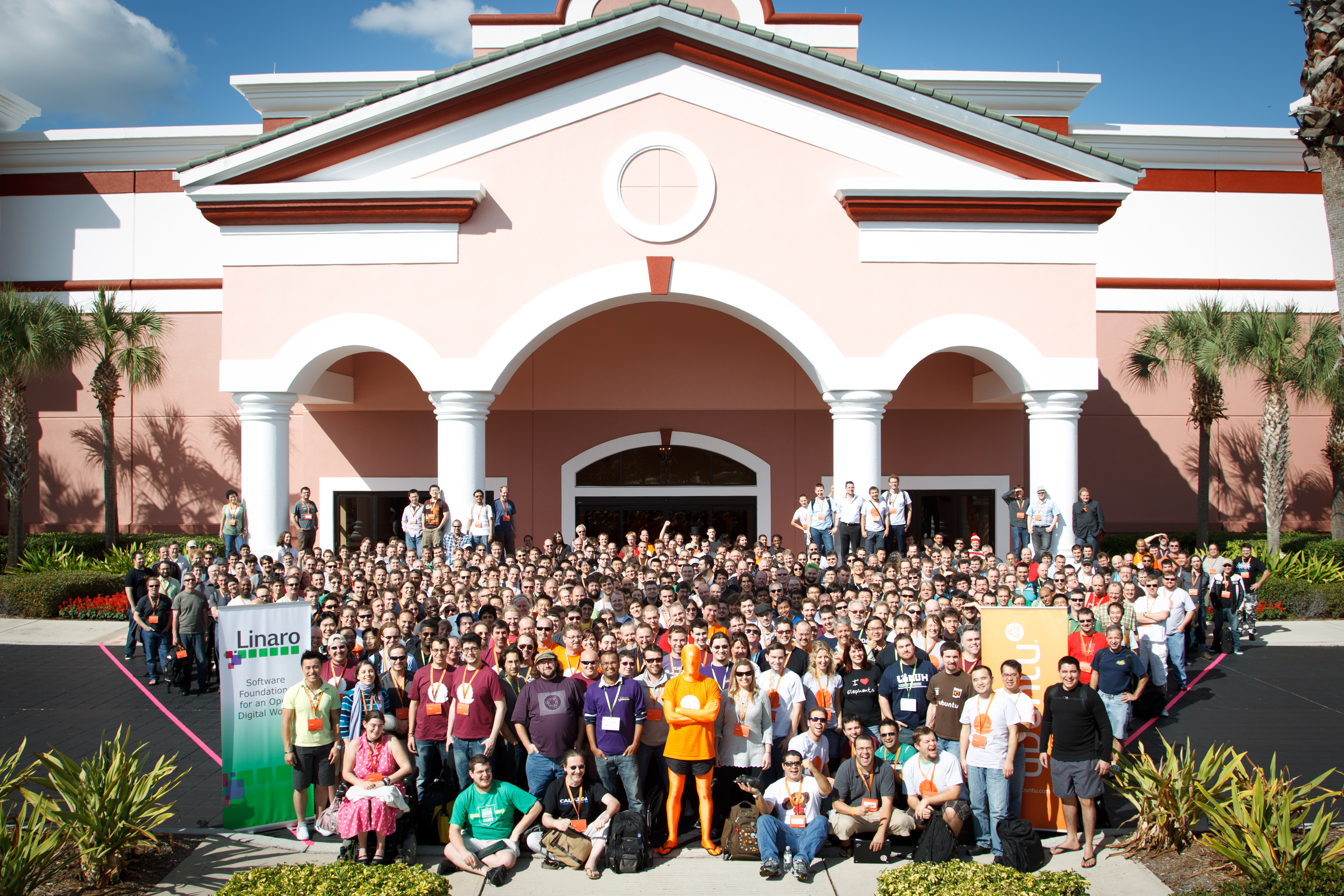
Ubuntu Developer Summit October 2011

Canonical has more than 1200 employees. The head office is in London on the 5th Floor of 3 More London Riverside, More London. Previous office locations include the 5th Floor of the Blue Fin Building, Southwark Street, and the 27th floor of Millbank Tower. In the summer of 2006, Canonical opened an office in Montreal to house its global support and services operation. Taipei 101 is also home to a Canonical office. There was formerly an OEM team in Lexington, Massachusetts, United States.

=== Current ===
Notable current employees of Canonical include:

- Mark Shuttleworth, CEO and founder of the Ubuntu project, former Debian maintainer of Apache and founder of Thawte Consulting (2004–), CEO until March 2010 and from July 2017 to present
- Jane Silber, Board of Directors, formerly CEO (March 2010-July 2017); formerly COO and leader of the Ubuntu One project

=== Past ===
Notable past employees:

- Ben Collins, former Debian Project Leader and kernel developer (2006–2009)
- Jeff Waugh, employee no. 3, GNOME and Planet aggregator developer, Business Development (2004–2006)
- Benjamin Mako Hill, core developer and community coordinator (2004–2005)
- Ian Jackson, developer of dpkg and former Debian Project Leader (2005–2007)
- Lars Wirzenius, first contributor to the Linux kernel and Linus Torvalds' former office mate (2007–2009)
- Scott James Remnant, formerly a Debian and GNU maintainer of GNU Libtool and co-author of the Planet aggregator (2004–2011)
- Matt Zimmerman, formerly of the Debian security team – worked at Canonical as Ubuntu Chief Technical Officer (2004–2011)
- Stuart Langridge (2009–2013)
- Jono Bacon, Ubuntu community leader (2006–2014)
- Björn Michaelsen, founding member and director at The Document Foundation, LibreOffice contributor (2011–2017)
