= Hock Tan =

CEO Of Broadcom, Inc.

- 陳福陽
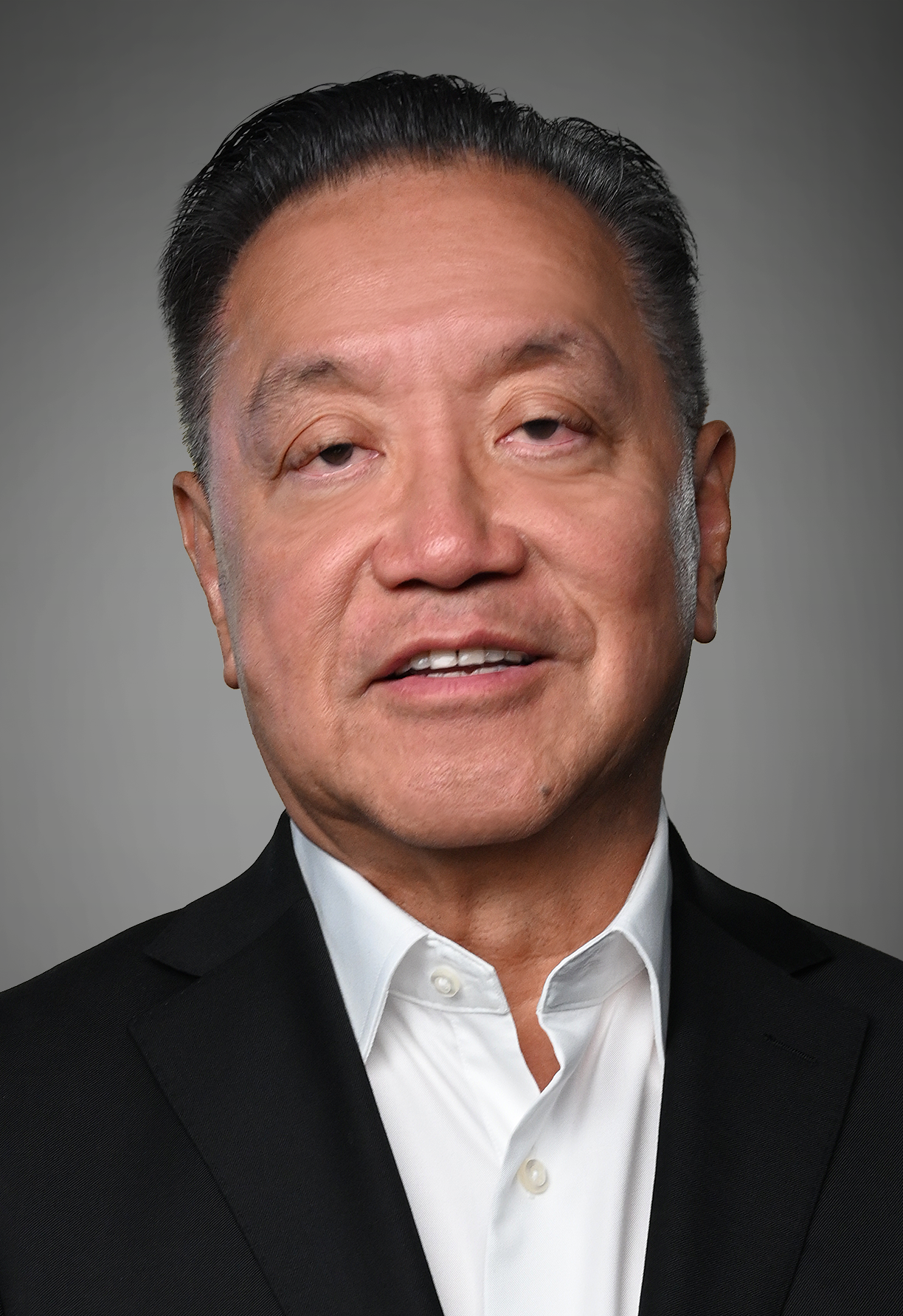
- Born: Tan Hock Eng; 1951 or 1952 (age 74–75); Penang, Federation of Malaya
- Citizenship: United States (since 1990)
- Education: Massachusetts Institute of Technology (BS, MS); Harvard University (MBA)
- Occupation: Business executive
- Years active: 1983–present
- Title: CEO of Broadcom
- Spouse: Lya Truong
- Children: 3

Tan Hock Eng (Chinese: 陳福陽; pinyin: Chén Fúyáng; Pe̍h-ōe-jī: Tân Hok-iâng; born 1951 or 1952) is an American business executive. He is the CEO of Broadcom Inc. He was the third-highest-paid CEO in the US in 2023, earning US$161.8 million that year.

== Early life and education ==
Tan was born in Penang, when Malaysia was a British protectorate, in 1951 or 1952. He received a scholarship to attend the Massachusetts Institute of Technology (MIT) in 1971. In 1975, he graduated with a bachelor's degree in mechanical engineering and earned a master's degree in the same subject later in the year. Tan also attended Harvard University to earn an MBA a few years later.

== Career ==
After receiving his MBA from Harvard Business School, Hock Tan held finance roles at General Motors and PepsiCo. Tan then returned to Malaysia to take on a director role at Hume Industries, a building materials manufacturer. Five years later, Tan became managing director of Pacven Investment, a Singapore-based venture capital firm he co-founded.

In 1992, Tan took a vice president role at Commodore International, a computer and electronics manufacturer founded by Jack Tramiel. Two years later, he joined the Pennsylvania-based chip maker Integrated Circuit Systems. In 1995, he became senior vice president. In 1999, he became chief executive officer. Under Tan, the company was taken private and eventually sold to an investor group led by senior management, Bain Capital, and Bear Stearns.

Avago was created following a US$2.66 billion private equity buyout of the Semiconductor Products Group of Agilent Technologies in 2005. Tan was hired to lead this new company as chief executive.

In 2015, Tan merged the company with Broadcom Corporation following an acquisition, leading to the creation of Broadcom Inc which he currently runs.

In 2017, Hock Tan led a $117 billion bid for Broadcom's competitor, the San Diego-based Qualcomm. The takeover would have constituted the largest technology deal of all time. In March 2018, the U.S. government blocked the transaction.

In April 2018 Broadcom announced that it had completed its move from Singapore back to the United States, which Tan claimed would yield $20 billion yearly in revenue for the US Treasury. Tan then pursued a series of deals that expanded Broadcom's software business, including CA Technologies in 2018 and Symantec’s corporate-focused security business in 2019.

In April 2020 Tan drew criticism when it was announced that he was forcing employees of Broadcom to return to work for 1 week a month during the COVID-19 outbreak. In September 2020, Tan stated that all Broadcom employees were working in the office in Asia excluding India, and 50% in North America.

In 2023, Tan's total compensation from Broadcom was $161.8 million, up 167% from the previous year and representing a CEO-to-median worker pay ratio of 510-to-1 for the company, as well as making Tan the third highest paid CEO in the US that year.

In 2024, he received the Dr. Morris Chang Exemplary Leadership Award from the Global Semiconductor Alliance. Since February 2024, he has been a member of the board of directors of Meta.

In 2025, Tan's total compensation from Broadcom was $205.3 million.

== Personal life ==
Tan became a U.S. citizen in 1990. He married his first wife, K. Lisa Yang. Their three children spent their early years in Singapore. The family moved to Philadelphia after their son Douglas was diagnosed with autism by a pediatric neurologist at the Children's Hospital of Philadelphia who suggested the boy would receive a better education in the U.S. Douglas attended the Timothy School in Philadelphia, and now lives in a Devereux Advanced Behavioral Health group home. Their daughter Eva has been diagnosed with a milder form of autism. Yang helped Eva with her "poor auditory processing skills" when she started taking classes at Harcum College. Eva was later hired by SAP under their Autism at Work program. Their other son, who does not have autism, works as an investment banker in California.

Tan and K. Lisa Yang divorced and Tan is now married to Lya Truong.

== Philanthropy ==
Hock Tan has donated money to his alma mater, the Massachusetts Institute of Technology (MIT). In 2015, Tan honored former MIT professor Nam P. Suh by donating $4 million to the school to endow a mechanical engineering professorship.

Hock Tan and his first wife, K. Lisa Yang, have also donated money to autism and disability charities. In 2015, Tan and Yang donated $10 million to Cornell University to fund the K. Lisa Yang and Hock E. Tan Employment and Disability Institute. In 2017, they donated $20 million to MIT to fund research to find effective treatments for autism and find its causes. Their donation created the Hock E. Tan and K. Lisa Yang Center for Autism Research. In 2019, Tan and Yang donated $20 million to Harvard Medical School to create the Tan-Yang Center for Autism Research, a sister of the MIT center. Tan and Yang donated $28 million in 2020 to MIT to create the Yang-Tan Center for Molecular Therapeutics in Neuroscience.
