= Daniel Kroening =

German computer scientist

Daniel Kroening (born 6 November 1975) is a German computer scientist, Professor in computer science at the University of Oxford, and Chief Science Officer at the company he co-founded, Diffblue Ltd. He is a fellow of Magdalen College.

== Early life ==
Kroening was born in Mainz, Rhineland-Palatinate, Germany. He attended Marie-Therese-Gymnasium, Erlangen, Bavaria from 1986 to 1990 and Rotenbühl Gymnasium, Saarbrücken, Saarland from 1990 to 1995. Kroening's early work in those highschool years includes implementations of data transfer protocols and a bulletin board system (BBS) software package with Internet access management for small ISPs, which he released under free/open source licenses. In 1992, Kroening joined Handshake e.V., a local non-profit ISP. From 1993, he hosted and operated Handshake's main BBS system and by the end of 1994, it was running his software. Since 1996, he was also involved in Handshake's executive management. After high school, Kroening completed his compulsory community service.

== Career ==
In winter term 1996, Kroening started studying computer science and economics at Saarland University. He received his diploma and doctoral degrees in 1999 and 2001. He was one of the fastest students in the history of the faculty, taking just four and a half years from first year student to doctorate.

After receiving his doctorate, Kroening worked at Carnegie Mellon University as a postdoc before joining ETH Zürich as assistant professor. He finally settled at Oxford University.

Kroening's research has its focus on program and hardware analysis.

He published textbooks on decision procedures and hardware design.

Kroening's professional activities include being a committee member of the leading program analysis conference CAV.

In his area of expertise, Kroening served as a consultant for companies like Intel, IBM and Fujitsu. In 2016 he co-founded Diffblue Ltd a developer tools company using artificial intelligence to write code. He is currently the Chief Science Officer of Diffblue.

== Selected publications ==
- Hasanbeig, M., Jeppu, N.Y., Abate, A., Melham, T. and Kroening, D., "Deepsynth: Automata Synthesis for Automatic Task Segmentation in Deep Reinforcement Learning". AAAI 2020, Vol. 35, No. 9, pages 7647-7656.
- Vijay D’Silva, Leopold Haller, Daniel Kroening: Abstract conflict driven learning. POPL 2013: 143-154.
- A Survey of Automated Techniques for Formal Software Verification, D’Silva, Vijay, Kroening, Daniel and Weissenbacher, Georg, IEEE Transactions on Computer-Aided Design of Integrated Circuits and Systems (TCAD), Vol. 27, No. 7, pages 1165–1178. July 2008.
- Decision Procedures — an Algorithmic Point of View, Kroening, Daniel, Strichman, Ofer, Springer. 2008.
- Verification of Boolean Programs with Unbounded Thread Creation, Cook, Byron, Kroening, Daniel and Sharygina, Natasha, Theoretical Computer Science (TCS), Vol. 388, pages 227—242. 2007.
