= U1DB =

- Developer(s): Ubuntu One team
- Initial release: 2011
- Stable release: 13.10 / October 8, 2013
- Repository: launchpad.net/u1db/
- Written in: Python, C, SQLite
- Available in: English
- Type: Document-oriented database
- License: GNU LGPL v3

U1DB is a cross-platform, cross-device, syncable database application programming interface (API). It allows applications to store JSON documents and synchronize them between machines and devices. U1DB is a schemaless document-oriented database API that does not need to contain any pre-defined list of fields. It can be implemented in any language, on any platform, using any data store backend.

U1DB was created when Canonical had scaling issues with CouchDB previously used in their Ubuntu One service. They were having problems with implementing their service for millions of users and at the same time providing good performance on large server farms as well as tablets and smart phones. Defining an interface (API) allowed them to implement their data synchronization service using different languages and data stores on each platform.

Implementations of U1DB
Platform(s)	Language	Back end database	Link
Ubuntu, Windows, OS X	Python	SQLite	The reference implementation
Ubuntu	Vala	SQLite	lp:shardbridge
Ubuntu, Windows, OS X	C	SQLite	part of lp:u1db
Ubuntu, Windows, OS X	Go	LevelDB and/or MongoDB	lp:gouda (in progress)
Web	JavaScript	localStorage	planned
Android	Java	SQLite	planned
iOS	Objective-C	SQLite	planned
