= Mocana =

IoT security company

Mocana Corporation
- Industry: Internet security, public key infrastructure, IoT security
- Founded: 2002; 24 years ago
- Headquarters: San Jose, California, United States
- Area served: Worldwide
- Parent: DigiCert
- Website: Official website

Mocana (founded in 2002) is a San Jose-based company that focuses on and embedded system security for industrial control systems and the Internet of Things (IoT). One of its main products, the IoT Security Platform, is a high-performance, ultra-optimized, OS-independent, high-assurance security platform that is intended to support all device classes. This decoupling of the security implementation from the rest of application development allows for easier development of software for devices comprising the "Internet of Things", in which numerous independent networked devices communicate with each other in various ways. Mocana was originally launched as an embedded systems security company, but in the early 2010s, the company shifted its focus to protecting data and apps on mobile devices.

== History ==
Mocana introduced its products in 2004 with a focus on embedded systems security. That same year the company launched Embedded Security Suite, a software product to secure communications between networked devices. In February 2005, while based in Menlo Park, California, the company joined the Freescale Semiconductor Developers Alliance Program, and delivered that group's first security software. In 2008, Mocana was cited as an example of how an independent company could provide security for smartphones.

The New York Times reported that Mocana's researchers had "discovered they could hack into a best-selling Internet-ready HDTV model with unsettling ease," and highlighted the opportunity for criminals to intercept information like credit card billing details.

Mocana sponsored the 7th Workshop on RFID Security and Privacy at the University of Massachusetts in 2011. It launched the Mobile Application Protection platform in 2011 with support for Android apps, and added iOS app support in 2012. Following a Series D funding round in 2012, total investment in Mocana was $47 million.

In September 2013, James Isaacs replaced co-founder and CEO Adrian Turner. In April 2016, Interim CEO Peter Graham replaced Isaacs.

In April 2016, Mocana spun off its mobile security business to Blue Cedar Networks. William Diotte replaced Graham as CEO in May 2016.

The company was acquired by DigiCert in January 2022.

== Products and services ==
Mocana's IoT Security Platform is a security software suite for embedded systems. The software provides the cryptographic controls (e.g. authentication, confidentiality, encryption, and device and data integrity verification) for embedded devices and applications.

The company also offers customizable user agreements and optional FIPS 140-2 validated cryptographic engines. Access to application source code is not required. The product's design is based in the assumption that many assurances of security from the device and its operating system may be compromised. This obviates the necessity of having "infallible" system-wide security policies.

In addition, Mocana offers consulting services, evaluating and advising on security threats in networked devices.

== Industries served ==
Mocana's security technology is used in airplane in-flight entertainment systems, medical devices, battlefield communications, automobile firmware, and cell phone carrier networks. Mocana senior analyst Robert Vamosi was cited in a 2011 piece in Bloomberg Businessweek comparing tech companies' approaches to security.

== Funding ==
Mocana's investors include Trident Capital (2012), Intel Capital (2011), Shasta Ventures, Southern Cross Venture Partners, and Symantec (2010). As of the August 2012 Series D, a total of $47 million has been raised.

== Awards, recognition, and accomplishments ==
- Recognized by Frost & Sullivan as the leading IoT security platform for industrial manufacturing and automation in 2017
- Mocana named most innovative security company by Leading Lights in 2017
- Named as to the OnDemand 100 in 2013.
- Recognized by the World Economic Forum as a 2012 Technology Pioneer
- Named to the "Red Herring Global 100" in 2008.
