= Canonical Academy =

Professional certification and training platform

Canonical Academy is an online professional certification and training platform developed by Canonical, the developer and publisher of the Ubuntu distribution of the Linux operating system. According to Canonical, the academy was launched to validate technical proficiency in Linux and Ubuntu administration through a system of practical, hands-on assessments.

== Methodology and structure ==
According to Canonical, the academy emphasizes validation of practical skills, rather than theoretical knowledge. The platform's core approach uses a cloud-based testing environment designed to simulate realistic workplace scenarios, with the goal of ensuring professionals are prepared for on-the-job challenges.

The training framework features:

- Self-paced learning: users can study and prepare for examinations without fixed course deadlines.
- Modular assessment: the certification process is structured into individual, timed exams. Successful completion of an individual exam earns a digital badge, which indicates the specific Ubuntu Long-Term Support (LTS) version to which the exam aligns (for example, Ubuntu 24.04 LTS).
- Full qualification: completing all required modular exams within a specific track leads to a comprehensive qualification being issued. Passing all four exams of the System Administrator track earns the Canonical Qualified System Administrator qualification.

=== System Administrator track ===
The platform's initial offering is the System Administrator track, which is designed for individuals seeking to validate their expertise in Linux and Ubuntu system management. As of November 2026, this track features examinations aligned with the Ubuntu 26.04 LTS release. It is composed of four examinations:

- Using Linux Terminal (cost: $100)
- Using Ubuntu Desktop
- Using Ubuntu Server
- Using DevOps Principles

== Development and community ==
Canonical has established a schedule for future content updates. The company actively solicits participation from the community, inviting professionals to contribute to building out the platform as beta testers and subject-matter experts.
