= Diffblue =

AI unit test-writing tool for Java code

Diffblue Ltd is a spin-out from University of Oxford whose Cover product uses AI to automatically write unit tests for Java code. It is similar to GitHub Copilot in that it uses AI to write code, but differs in that it writes code fully autonomously vs. providing code suggestions for humans to review and edit. Diffblue was founded by Daniel Kroening and Peter Schrammel in 2016, and Mathew Lodge became CEO in July 2019

In 2017, Diffblue raised £17.3 million in Series A funding led by Goldman Sachs and Oxford Sciences Innovation. In 2020, Diffblue released a freeware version, Cover Community Edition. It can be used by both open source and commercial organisations. Diffblue raised $7m in January 2022 in a round led by venture capitalist IP Group, and a further $8m in November 2022 in a round led by AlbionVC.

Diffblue customers include Goldman Sachs, S&P Global, Citi, JP Morgan and AWS.
