= LexInnova Technologies =

- Type: Private
- Industry: Intellectual Property, Legal, Technology
- Founded: 2009; 17 years ago
- Founder: Abhi Verma
- Headquarters: Houston, USA
- Key people: Abhi Verma, Founder and Managing Director
- Services: Patent Litigation Consulting; IP Strategy; eDiscovery and Litigation Support; Patent Licensing; Software Asset Management; Technology Experts; M&A Due Diligence; Contract Management; Research and Compliance
- Number of employees: 100+
- Website: www.lex-innova.com

LexInnova Technologies, LLC, is a legal services and technology consulting company headquartered in Houston, Texas. It specializes in providing patent litigation consulting, patent analytics, eDiscovery, legal due diligence, license management, intellectual property advisory, and technology consulting services to law firms and corporations. The company also has offices at Cupertino, California, Houston, Texas and Gurgaon, India.

== Overview ==
LexInnova Technologies was founded in May 2009, by Abhi Verma, an alumnus of IIT Varanasi and Harvard Law. The company also provide consulting to technology companies to help them focus their R&D efforts and identify gaps in their IP portfolio. The company employs engineers, technocrats, lawyers, scientists and legal project managers. In July, 2015, LexInnova was cited in Forbes magazine for its patent portfolio analytics report on Internet of Things.

== Notable publications ==
LexInnova's analysis of the IP portfolios of Nokia and Alcatel-Lucent was published in USA Today, Computerworld and Barron's magazine when news broke of the two companies merging on 14 April 2015.

LexInnova's research report and opinions have been featured in a technology article on the Internet of Things (IoT) and has been published in Forbes in July 2015, CIO Insight, and The Investor's Business Daily.

Their reports on Chinese smartphone maker Xiaomi have featured in The Wall Street Journal, CNBC, International Business Times,

Lexinnova's report on ‘Network Security: Overview of patent out-licensing opportunities’ evaluated the information-security portfolios of information-security vendors and reflected in Australian CSO, WIPR and Fierce Interprise Communications defining the number of patents held by different companies.

Fierce Wireless Tech cited LexInnova's Wireless Power analysis on the biggest amount of patent applications filed and received for technology related to wireless power.

In Enterprise Tech publication (May 2015) LexInnova's report on 3D memory was mentioned in accordance to the allusion that the majority of R&D in SSD technology has been in 3D NAND, which is the most important technology for increasing the capacity and lowering the cost per gigabyte of storage drives.

LexInnova's observation of Virtual reality patent race taken from the same report was mentioned in Hypergrid Business article ‘Sony leads virtual reality patent race’.

Insights from LexInnova's report on Wireless Power have been featured by Qualcomm, American global semiconductor company, in its company blog.
