= Symantec =

Symantec may refer to:

- Gen Digital, an American consumer software company formerly known as Symantec
- Symantec Security, a brand of enterprise security software purchased by Broadcom from Symantec in August 2019
