= Comparison of encrypted external drives =

This is a technical feature comparison of commercial encrypted external drives.

== Background information ==
Name	Developer/Manufacturer	Release Year	Current Model?
datAshur PRO	iStorage Limited	2015	Yes
datAshur PRO²	iStorage Limited	2019-08	Yes
diskAshur PRO²	iStorage Limited	2017	Yes
SafeStick SuperSonic	BlockMaster	2009	No
IronKey S100	IronKey	2005	No
IronKey Basic S200	IronKey	2009	No
IronKey Keypad 200	IronKey	2022-09	Yes
IronKey D200	IronKey	2009	No
CryptX2	CryptX2 / Open Source	2012	No
DataTraveler 5000	Kingston Technology	2010-01	No
DataTraveler Locker+	Kingston Technology	2009-10	No
DataTraveler Locker+ G2	Kingston Technology	2012-07	No
DataTraveler Locker+ G3	Kingston Technology	2014-01	Yes
DataTraveler Vault	Kingston Technology	2008-05	No
DataTraveler Vault – Privacy Edition	Kingston Technology	2009-01	No
DataTraveler Vault Privacy 3.0	Kingston Technology	2020-07	Yes
JumpDrive SecureII Plus	Lexar	2009-12	No
IronClad	Lockheed Martin	2010	No
Cruzer Enterprise	SanDisk	2008-11	No
Store 'n' Go Corporate	Verbatim	2010-06	No
Name	Developer/Manufacturer	Release Year	Current Model?

- Ironkey was acquired by Kingston Technology in February 2016
- IronClad is a technology, a secure type of "PC on a stick" (flash drive which has an Operating System included), which runs on top of Ironkey drive. It is also known as a "turnkey solution", as in it "plugs and plays".

== Operating systems ==
Name	Windows	FreeBSD	Linux	Mac OS	NetBSD	OpenBSD
SafeStick SuperSonic	Yes	No	Yes	Yes	No	No
IronKey S100	Yes	No	Yes	Yes	No	No
IronKey S200	Yes	No	Yes	Yes	No	No
IronKey D200	Yes	No	Yes	Yes	No	No
CryptX2	Yes	Yes	Yes	Yes	Yes	Yes
DataTraveler 5000	Yes	No	No	No	No	No
DataTraveler Locker+	Yes	No	No	Yes	No	No
DataTraveler Vault	Yes	No	Public partition only	Public partition only	No	No
DataTraveler Vault – Privacy Edition	Yes	No	No	Yes	No	No
IronClad	Yes	No	Yes	Yes	No	No
Cruzer Enterprise	Yes	Unknown	Unknown	Yes	Unknown	Unknown
Name	Windows	FreeBSD	Linux	Mac OS	NetBSD	OpenBSD

== Features ==
- Bootable: Whether (with the appropriate OS installed on the drive and supporting BIOS on a computer) the drive can be used to boot a computer.
- Encryption Type: Type of encryption used.
- Certification: Whether FIPS 140-2 or similar validation has been passed.
- Managed: Whether enterprise level management software for maintaining large numbers of devices is included.
- Interface: List of USB, Firewire, eSATA, or other interfaces for connection a computer.
- Max Capacity: Maximum size drive is available in.
- Included Software: List of any included software, excluding any standard freeware or trialware obtainable by an end user.
- Other Features: Other notable features that differentiate the device.

Name	Bootable	Encryption Type	Certification	Managed	Interface	Max Capacity	Included Software	Other Features
datAshur PRO	Yes	AES 256-bit XTS Hardware Encryption	FIPS 140-2 Level 3	No	USB-A 3.x Gen 1	64 GB		OS & Platform independent- software free, Keypad, MIL-STD-810F, IP57 certified, 3 years manufacturer warranty
diskAshur PRO²	Yes	AES 256-bit XTS Hardware Encryption	FIPS 140-2 Level 2 FIPS 140-2 Level 3	No	USB-A 3.0 Gen1	5 TB		OS & Platform independent- software freeware, Keypad, integrated USB cable, Shingled magnetic Recording (SMR)
iStorage diskAshur DT2 HDD external	Unknown	AES 256-bit Hardware Encryption	FIPS 140-2 Level 2 FIPS 140-2 Level 3, FIPS 197		USB-B 3.x Gen 1	18 TB		Keypad, external Power Supply, 2 year manufacturer warranty
iStorage diskAshur M.2	Unknown	AES 256-bit Hardware Encryption	FIPS 140-3 Level 3		USB-A 3.x Gen1	2 TB		waterproof, IP68 certified, Keypad, incl. USB cable (USB-A and USB-C), three years manufacturer-warranty
SafeStick SuperSonic	No	AES 256-bit CBC Hardware Encryption	CESG CCTM, FIPS 140-2	Optional (with SafeConsole)	USB 2.0	8 GB		High transfer speeds, Inactivity lock
IronKey S100	No	AES 128-bit CBC Hardware Encryption	FIPS 140-2 Level 2	Enterprise Model only	USB 2.0	16 GB	Identity Manager; Secure Sessions	
IronKey S200	No	AES 256-bit CBC Hardware Encryption	FIPS 140-2 Level 3	Enterprise Model only	USB 2.0	16 GB	Identity Manager; Secure Sessions	
IronKey D200	No	AES 256-bit CBC Hardware Encryption	FIPS 140-2 Level 3	Enterprise Model only	USB 2.0	32 GB	Identity Manager; Secure Sessions	
CryptX2	Yes	AES 256-bit CBC Hardware Encryption	No	No	USB 2.0	64 GB / Future Support for 4 TB	No Software Required	ID Verify, Panic Mode, Upgradeable Firmware
DataTraveler 5000	No	AES 256-bit XTS Hardware Encryption	FIPS 140-2 Level 2	No	USB 2.0	16 GB		Water resistant
DataTraveler Locker+	No	Hardware Encryption	No	No	USB 2.0	32 GB	No	
DataTraveler Vault	No	AES 256-bit Hardware Encryption	No	No	USB 2.0	32 GB	DTVaultLock	Second unsecured partition
DataTraveler Vault – Privacy Edition	No	AES 256-bit Hardware Encryption	No		USB 2.0	32 GB		Waterproof to 4'
IronClad	Yes	AES 256-bit CBC Hardware Encryption	FIPS 140-2 Level 3	Yes	USB 2.0	16 GB		
Cruzer Enterprise	No	Hardware	FIPS 140-2 ?	Yes	USB 2.0			
Apricorn Aegis Secure Key 3NXC	Unknown	AES 256-bit Hardware Encryption	FIPS 140-2 Level 3		USB-C 3.x Gen1	64 GB		Keypad, IP67 certified, integrated rechargeable battery, 3 years manifaturerer warranty
Apricorn Aegis Fortress	Unknown	AES 256-bit Hardware Encryption	FIPS 140-2 Level 3		USB-Micro-B 3.x Gen1	5 TB		aluminum housing, Keypad, incl. USB cable (USB-A), incl. USB cable (USB-C), Shingled magnetic Recording (SMR), three years manufacturer-warranty
datAshur PRO²	Unknown	AES 256-bit Hardware Encryption	FIPS 140-2 Level 3		USB-A 3.x Gen 1	512 GB		Keypad, IP58 zertifiziert, 3 years manufacturer warranty
Kingston IronKey Keypad 200	Unknown	AES 256-bit Hardware Encryption	FIPS 140-2 Level 3		USB-A 3.x Gen 1	128 GB		Keypad, XTS-AES, IP57
ClevX SecureData SecureDrive KP SSD	Unknown	AES 256-bit Hardware Encryption	FIPS 140-2 Level 3		USB-Micro-B 3.x Gen1	2 TB	Keypad, incl. USB cable (USB-A)	
Name	Bootable	Encryption Type	Certification	Managed	Interface	Max Capacity	Included Software	Other Features

== See also ==
- Comparison of disk encryption software
- Disk encryption software
