= Sentry 2020 =

Commercial software program

- Developer: Softwinter
- Operating system: Microsoft Windows, Windows Mobile
- Type: Transparent disk encryption
- License: Proprietary
- Website: www.softwinter.com

Sentry 2020 is a commercial software program for transparent disk encryption for PCs and PDAs using Microsoft Windows or Windows Mobile. It was developed by Softwinter, Inc. All information stored is encrypted and decrypted each time an application performs a read/write operation on a Sentry volume.

== See also ==
- LibreCrypt, an alternative system that also works on both PC and PDAs
- Disk encryption
- Disk encryption software
- Comparison of disk encryption software
