= E4M =

Free disk encryption software

- Original author(s): Paul Le Roux
- Initial release: 1997; 28 years ago
- Final release: 2.02a / 2000; 25 years ago
- Operating system: Windows 9x, Windows NT
- Size: 465 kB
- Type: Transparent disk encryption
- License: Free software

Encryption for the Masses (E4M) is a free disk encryption software for Windows NT and Windows 9x families of operating systems. E4M is discontinued; it is no longer maintained. Its author, former criminal cartel boss Paul Le Roux, joined Shaun Hollingworth (the author of the Scramdisk) to produce the commercial encryption product DriveCrypt for the security company SecurStar.

The popular source-available freeware program TrueCrypt is based on E4M's source code. However, TrueCrypt uses a different container format than E4M, which makes it impossible to use one of these programs to access an encrypted volume created by the other.

== Allegation of stolen source code ==
Shortly after TrueCrypt version 1.0 was released in February 2004, the TrueCrypt Team reported receiving emails from Wilfried Hafner, manager of SecurStar, claiming that Paul Le Roux had stolen the source code of E4M from SecurStar as an employee. According to the TrueCrypt Team, the emails stated that Le Roux illegally distributed E4M, and authored an illegal license permitting anyone to base derivative work on E4M and distribute it freely, which Hafner alleges Le Roux did not have any right to do, claiming that all versions of E4M always belonged only to SecurStar. For a time, this led the TrueCrypt Team to stop developing and distributing TrueCrypt.

== See also ==
- On-the-fly encryption (OTFE)
- Disk encryption
- Disk encryption software
- Comparison of disk encryption software
