= PGPDisk =

PGP Virtual Disk is a disk encryption system that allows one to create a virtual encrypted disk within a file.

Older versions for Windows NT were freeware (for example, bundled with PGP v6.0.2i; and with some of the CKT builds of PGP). These are still available for download, but no longer maintained. Today, PGP Virtual Disk is available as part of the PGP Desktop product family, running on Windows 2000/XP/Vista and macOS.

The system requires troubleshooting when operating within Windows 10 and 11 due to their Device Guard.

== See also ==
- Disk encryption software
- Comparison of disk encryption software
- United States v. Boucher – federal criminal case involving PGPDisk-protected data
