= Scramdisk =

Scramdisk is a free on-the-fly encryption program for Windows 95, Windows 98, and Windows Me. A non-free version was also available for Windows NT.

The original Scramdisk is no longer maintained; its author, Shaun Hollingworth, joined Paul Le Roux (the author of E4M) to produce Scramdisk's commercial successor, DriveCrypt. The author of Scramdisk provided a driver for Windows 9x, and the author of E4M provided a driver for Windows NT, enabling cross-platform versions of both programs.

There is a new project called Scramdisk 4 Linux which provides access to Scramdisk and TrueCrypt containers. Older versions of TrueCrypt included support for Scramdisk.

== Licensing ==
Although Scramdisk's source code is still available, it's stated that it was only released and licensed for private study and not for further development.

However, because it contains an implementation of the MISTY1 Encryption Algorithm (by Hironobu Suzuki, a.k.a. H2NP) licensed under the GNU GPL Version 2, it is in violation of the GPL.

== See also ==
- Disk encryption
- Disk encryption software
- Comparison of disk encryption software
