= Private Disk =

- Developer: Dekart
- Stable release: 2.14 / June 20, 2014; 12 years ago
- Operating system: Windows 9x, Windows NT 4.0 through Windows 8
- Available in: 17 languages
- Type: Disk encryption software
- License: Shareware
- Website: dekart.com/products/encryption/private_disk/

Private Disk is a disk encryption application for the Microsoft Windows operating system, developed by Dekart SRL. It works by creating a virtual drive, the contents of which is encrypted on-the-fly; other software can use the drive as if it were a usual one.

One of Private Disk's key selling points is in its ease of use, which is achieved by hiding complexity from the end user (e.g. data wiping is applied transparently when an encrypted image is deleted.) This simplicity does however reduce its flexibility in some respects (e.g. it only allows the use of AES-256 encryption.)

Although Private Disk uses a NIST certified implementation of the AES and SHA-256/384/512 algorithms, this certification is restricted to a single component of Private Disk; the encryption/hash library used and not to Private Disk as a complete system.

== Feature highlights ==
- NIST-certified implementation of AES-256-bit, and SHA-2. Private Disk complies with FIPS 197 and FIPS 180-2
- CBC mode with secret IVs is used to encrypt the sectors of the storage volume
- Disk Firewall, an application-level filter, which allows only trusted programs to access the virtual drive
- Ability to run directly from a removable drive, requiring no local installation
- Offers access to encrypted data on any system, even if administrative privileges are not available
- Encrypted images can be accessed on Windows Mobile and Windows CE handhelds; this is achieved by making the encrypted container format compatible with containers used by SecuBox (disk encryption software by Aiko Solutions)
- File wiping is applied when deleting an encrypted image
- PD File Move, a file migration tool, which will locate the specified files on the system and securely move them to an encrypted disk
- Compatibility with Windows 9x and Windows NT operating systems
- Autorun and Autofinish automatically start a program or a script when a virtual disk is mounted or dismounted
- Encrypted backup of an encrypted image
- Password quality meter
- Automatic backup of a disk's encryption key
- Built-in password recovery tool
- Compatibility with 64-bit platforms

Existing versions

There are multiple versions of Private Disk, which provide a different feature set:

- Private Disk - hard disk encryption software that uses 256-bit AES encryption, is highly configurable, offers application-level protection, USB disk portability, etc.
- Private Disk Multifactor is a superset of Private Disk, providing the same functionality, adding support for biometric authentication, as well as smart-card or token-based authentication.
- Private Disk Light is a free version, it uses AES-128 and comes with a restricted set of features.
- Private Disk SDK is a software development kit that can be used to build a custom application which provides data encryption facilities.

== See also ==
- Disk encryption software
- Comparison of disk encryption software
