= Deniable authentication =

Message authentication verifiable only by participants

In cryptography, deniable authentication is message authentication between a set of participants where the participants themselves can be confident in the authenticity of the messages, but it cannot be proved to a third party after the event.

In practice, deniable authentication between two parties can be achieved through the use of message authentication codes (MACs) by making sure that if an attacker is able to decrypt the messages, they would also know the MAC key as part of the protocol, and would thus be able to forge authentic-looking messages. For example, in the Off-the-Record Messaging (OTR) protocol, MAC keys are derived from the asymmetric decryption key through a cryptographic hash function. In addition to that, the OTR protocol also reveals used MAC keys as part of the next message, after they have already been used to authenticate previously received messages, and they are not used again.

== See also ==
- Deniable encryption
- Plausible deniability
- Malleability
- Undeniable signature
