= Client-side encryption =

Type of encryption

Client-side encryption is the cryptographic technique of encrypting data on the sender's side, before it is transmitted to a server such as a cloud storage service. Client-side encryption features an encryption key that is not available to the service provider, making it difficult or impossible for service providers to decrypt hosted data. Client-side encryption allows for the creation of applications whose providers cannot access the data their users have stored, thus offering a high level of privacy.

Applications utilizing client-side encryption are sometimes marketed under the misleading or incorrect term "zero-knowledge", but this is a misnomer, as the term zero-knowledge describes something entirely different in the context of cryptography.

== Details ==
Client-side encryption seeks to eliminate the potential for data to be viewed by service providers (or third parties that compel service providers to deliver access to data), client-side encryption ensures that data and files that are stored in the cloud can only be viewed on the client-side of the exchange. This prevents data loss and the unauthorized disclosure of private or personal files, providing increased peace of mind for its users.

Implementing client-side encryption is often recommended by industry professionals to enhance the protection of sensitive information.

=== Examples of services that use client-side encryption by default ===
- Tresorit
- MEGA
- Cryptee
- Cryptomator

=== Examples of services that optionally support client-side encryption ===
- Apple iCloud offers optional client-side encryption when "Advanced Data Protection for iCloud" is enabled.
- Google Drive, Google Docs, Google Meet, Google Calendar, and Gmail — However, as of Jul 2024, optional client-side encryption features are only available to paid users.

=== Examples of services that do not support client-side encryption ===
- Dropbox

=== Examples of client-side encrypted services that no longer exist ===
- SpiderOak Backup

== See also ==
- End-to-end encryption – the encryption of data between two different clients that are communicating with each other
- Homomorphic encryption
