= Institute for Applied Information Processing and Communications =

Austrian Institute

Coordinates: 47°03′30″N 15°27′28″E

The Institute for Applied Information Processing and Communications (IAIK) is part of the Faculty of Computer Science and Biomedical Engineering at the Graz University of Technology (TU Graz). IAIK is concerned with aspects of computer security and information security. Current focal points are set on design of new cryptographic algorithms, implementation of cryptographic algorithms and protocols in hardware as well as in software, network security, e-Government, and trusted computing.

IAIK conducts applied research into these areas, fostering a holistic view of the aspects of computer and information security. Teaching activities closely follow the latest developments in IAIK’s research fields. The activities of IAIK are led by Stefan Mangard after Reinhard Posch abdicated in 2019.

IAIK is specialized on following specific aspects of computer and information security:

- VLSI design and security
- Implementation attacks
- RFID hardware and security
- Software security
- E-Government
- Trusted computing
- Design and analysis of hash and block cipher primitives
- Network security
- Formal methods in verification and design
