= Cryptomator =

Free and open-source file encryption software

- Original author: Sebastian Stenzel
- Developer: Skymatic GmbH
- Initial release: March 9, 2016; 10 years ago
- Stable release: 1.19.2 (Linux, MacOS, Windows) / 20 March 2026; 1 day ago
- Written in: Java, CSS
- Operating system: Windows, MacOS, Linux, Android, iOS
- Platform: x86-64, ARM
- Available in: 48 languages
- License: GPLv3
- Website: cryptomator.org
- Repository: github.com/cryptomator/cryptomator

Cryptomator is open source encryption software that provides encryption for cloud drives. It provides transparent, client-side encryption for personal cloud storage. Cryptomator encrypts each file separately and then allows the user to sync files with a cloud or local storage of choice. It is available for all major operating system including Android, iOS, Windows, Mac, Linux.

Cryptomator uses AES-256 standard encryption and WebDAV and relies on its open-source model for software verifiability, trust and bug fixing. The software encrypts each file individually.

== History ==
In 2017, Cure53 audited the software. Cryptomator was lauded for its high degree of robustness in cryptographic implementation, but criticized use of AES in insecure ECB mode. Tobias Hagemann, however, said this was a false positive.

In December 2021, Cryptomator 2.0 was released for iOS, which was rewritten in Swift and integrated with the native iOS Files app.

In January 2022, an update was released for a bug that leaked file path to Apple, because of the integration with Apple's file and use of File Provider Extension API.

== Reception ==
Cryptomator received the CeBIT innovation award in 2016 for "Usable Security and Privacy".
