= Quick Heal =

Indian multinational cybersecurity software company

Quick Heal Technologies
- Company type: Public
- Traded as: BSE: 539678; NSE: QUICKHEAL
- ISIN: INE306L01010
- Industry: Cybersecurity software; Computer software
- Founded: 1993; 33 years ago
- Founders: Kailash Katkar; Sanjay Katkar
- Headquarters: Pune, Maharashtra, India
- Area served: Worldwide
- Key people: Kailash Katkar (Chairman & Managing Director); Sanjay Katkar (Jt. Managing Director)
- Products: Cybersecurity software
- Services: Computer security
- Revenue: ▲₹361 crore (US$38 million) (2022)
- Net income: ▲₹83.19 crore (US$8.7 million) (2022)
- Number of employees: 986 (2022)
- Website: quickheal.com

Quick Heal is an Indian multinational cybersecurity software company, headquartered in Pune. The company develops security software for consumers, servers, cloud computing environments and small and medium enterprises. Its enterprise product offerings operate under the brand name Seqrite.

Quick Heal Technologies Ltd is listed on BSE and NSE.

== History ==
The company was started as CAT Computer Services (P) Ltd, a computer service centre, in 1995. The company "CAT Computer Services (P) Ltd" was rebranded to Quick Heal Technologies Limited by Kailash Katkar and Sanjay Katkar in 2007.

In 2010, Quick Heal received an investment of ₹60 crore from Sequoia Capital. A new branch office was opened in Madurai, Tamil Nadu. In 2012, offices were opened in Japan and the US, and in 2013, offices were opened in Africa and UAE.

In 2016, Quick Heal Technologies acquired an IT security firm Junco Technologies to launch Seqrite Services.

In 2016, Quick Heal Technologies launched its IPO which valued the company at a market value of ₹1,500 crore.
