= IronKey =

Brand of USB devices

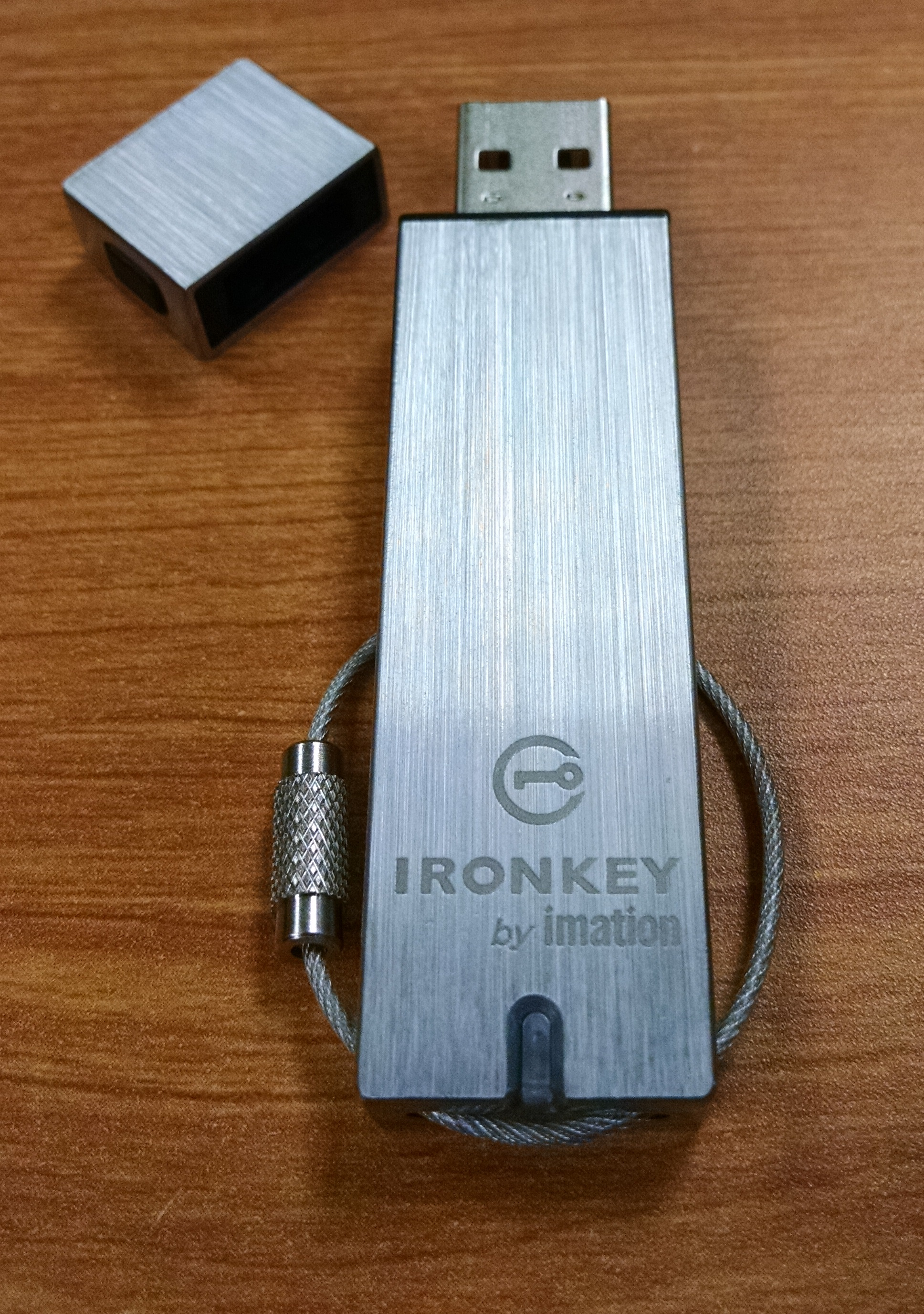
- IronKey S250 8GB encrypted USB flash drive
- Product type: USB flash drive
- Current owner: Kingston Technology
- Previous owners: Imation
- Website: www.ironkey.com

IronKey is the brand name of a family of encrypted USB portable storage devices owned by Kingston Digital, the flash memory affiliate of Kingston Technology Company, Inc.

== History ==
From 2005 to 2012, IronKey was an Internet security and privacy company based in California. IronKey's founding was partially funded by the U.S. federal government, with a grant of US$1.4 million through the Homeland Security Research Projects Agency. Their products have been used by the U.S. government in various areas.

Imation acquired IronKey in September 2011. In October 2012, IronKey rebranded itself as Marble Security, and the IronKey brand became wholly owned by Imation. As part of Imation, the IronKey portfolio includes products and intellectual property from the former IronKey, as well as technologies from Imation acquisitions of MXI Security and ENCRYPTX.

On February 8, 2016, Kingston Technology Company, Inc., announced it had acquired the USB technology and assets of IronKey from Imation. On the same day, DataLocker announced it had acquired Ironkey's Enterprise Management Service (EMS) and other assets from Imation.

In November 2018, Kingston announced that the IronKey had new features and was now FIPS 140-2 Level 3 certified.

In early 2021, a reported 7,000 Bitcoin were stranded in an IronKey flash drive due to a forgotten password. The owner, programmer Stefan Thomas, did not utilize the Enterprise Management Service for password recovery. In 2023, a company named Unciphered found a way to unlock IronKey USB sticks similar to the one Thomas used.

=== Windows To Go portable workspaces ===
Among Imation's IronKey products are flash drives certified by Microsoft for Windows To Go. Windows To Go is an enterprise feature of Windows 8 that enables the creation of a workspace that can be booted from a USB-connected external drive on PCs that meet Microsoft certification requirements, regardless of the operating system running on the PC. A Windows To Go product, the IronKey Workspace W300, received the Editors' Choice accolade from PC Magazine in February 2013.

== Products ==
=== Secure Portable Storage ===
- IronKey Enterprise S250 and D250 USB flash drives
- IronKey F200 Biometric Flash Drive
- IronKey Basic S250 and D250 USB flash drives
- IronKey F150 Flash Drive
- IronKey Personal S250 and D250 USB flash drives
- IronKey H100 External USB Hard Drive
- IronKey H200 Biometric External USB Hard Drive
- IronKey F100 Flash Drive
- IronKey D80 Flash Drive
- IronKey H80 External USB Hard Drive
- IronKey D300S USB Flash Drive
- IronKey D300SM USB Flash Drive
- Ironkey D500S USB Flash Drive
- IronKey S1000 Encrypted USB Flash Drive

=== IronKey Secure Workspaces ===
Windows 8:

- IronKey Workspace W700 Windows To Go (Microsoft certified, FIPS Certified)
- IronKey Workspace W500 Windows To Go (Microsoft certified)
- IronKey Workspace W300 Windows To Go (Microsoft certified)

Windows 7:

- IronKey Workspace MWES USB Flash Drive with Microsoft Windows Embedded Standard (MWES) edition software.
