= BestCrypt =

Commercial disk encryption app available for Windows, Linux, macOS and Android

- BestCrypt for Windows v9.0
- Developer(s): Jetico Inc. Oy
- Initial release: 1995; 30 years ago
- Stable release: 9.08.4 / May 25, 2023; 21 months ago
- Operating system: Windows 9x; Windows 2000 and later (including Windows Server); OS X 10.6 or later; Linux 2.6 or later (including Android)
- Size: 5.6–52.3 MB
- Available in: English, Arabic, Chinese simplified, Czech, Dutch, Persian, French, German, Italian, Latvian, Polish, Russian, Serbian, Spanish, Turkish
- Type: Disk encryption software
- License: Trialware
- Website: www.jetico.com/data-encryption

BestCrypt, developed by Jetico, is a commercial disk encryption app available for Windows, Linux, macOS and Android.

BestCrypt comes in two editions: BestCrypt Volume Encryption to encrypt entire disk volumes; BestCrypt Container Encryption to encrypt virtual disks stored as computer files.

BestCrypt also provides the complimentary data erasure utility BCWipe.

== Cryptographic Algorithms ==
BestCrypt supports a wide variety of block cipher algorithms including AES, Serpent, Blowfish, Twofish, DES, Triple DES, GOST 28147-89. All ciphers support CBC and LRW modes of operation while AES, Twofish and Serpent also support XTS mode.

== Features ==
- Create and mount a virtual drive encrypted using AES, Blowfish, Twofish, CAST-128 and various other encryption methods. BestCrypt v.8 and higher can alternatively mount a subfolder on a NTFS disk instead of a drive. Encrypted virtual disk images are compatible across Windows, Linux and Mac OS X.
- Encrypt a set of files into a single, self-extracting archive.
- Transparently encrypt entire partitions or volumes together with pre-boot authentication for encrypted boot partitions.
- Two-factor authentication.
- Support for size-efficient Dynamic Containers with the Smart Free Space Monitoring technology.
- Hardware accelerated encryption.
- Anti-keylogging facilities to protect container and volume passwords.
- Data erasure utility BCWipe to erase unprotected copies of data to complement encryption.
- Secret sharing and Public Key authentication methods in addition to basic password-based authentication.

BestCrypt Volume Encryption v.3 main window

BestCrypt for Mac v.1.3 control panel

== See also ==
- Comparison of disk encryption software
