= Linux Unified Key Setup =

Disk encryption software

The Linux Unified Key Setup (LUKS) is a disk encryption specification created by Clemens Fruhwirth in 2004 and originally intended for Linux.

LUKS implements a platform-independent standard on-disk format for use in various tools. This facilitates compatibility and interoperability among different programs and operating systems, and assures that they all implement password management in a secure and documented manner.

== Description ==
LUKS is used to encrypt a block device. The contents of the encrypted device are arbitrary, and therefore any filesystem can be encrypted, including swap partitions. There is an unencrypted header at the beginning of an encrypted volume, which allows up to 8 (LUKS1) or 32 (LUKS2) encryption keys to be stored along with encryption parameters such as cipher type and key size.

The presence of this header is a major difference between LUKS and dm-crypt, since the header allows multiple different passphrases to be used, with the ability to change and remove them. If the header is lost or corrupted, the device will no longer be decryptable.

Encryption is done with a multi-layer approach. First, the block device is encrypted using a master key. This master key is encrypted with each active user key. User keys are derived from passphrases, FIDO2 security keys, TPMs or smart cards. The multi-layer approach allows users to change their passphrase without re-encrypting the whole block device. Key slots can contain information to verify user passphrases or other types of keys.

There are two versions of LUKS, with LUKS2 featuring resilience to header corruption, and using the Argon2 key derivation function by default, whereas LUKS1 uses PBKDF2. Conversion between both versions of LUKS is possible in certain situations, but some features may not be available with LUKS1 such as Argon2. LUKS2 uses JSON as a metadata format.

Available cryptographic algorithms depend on individual kernel support of the host. Libgcrypt can be used as a backend for hashing, which supports all of its algorithms. It is up to the operating system vendor to choose the default algorithm. LUKS1 makes use of an anti-forensics technique called AFsplitter, allowing for secure data erasure and protection.

=== LUKS with LVM ===
Logical Volume Management can be used alongside LUKS.

LVM on LUKS
When LVM is used on an unlocked LUKS container, all underlying partitions (which are LVM logical volumes) can be encrypted with a single key. This is akin to splitting a LUKS container into multiple partitions. The LVM structure is not visible until the disk is decrypted.
LUKS on LVM
When LUKS is used to encrypt LVM logical volumes, an encrypted volume can span multiple devices. The underlying LVM volume group is visible without decrypting the encrypted volumes.

=== Full disk encryption ===
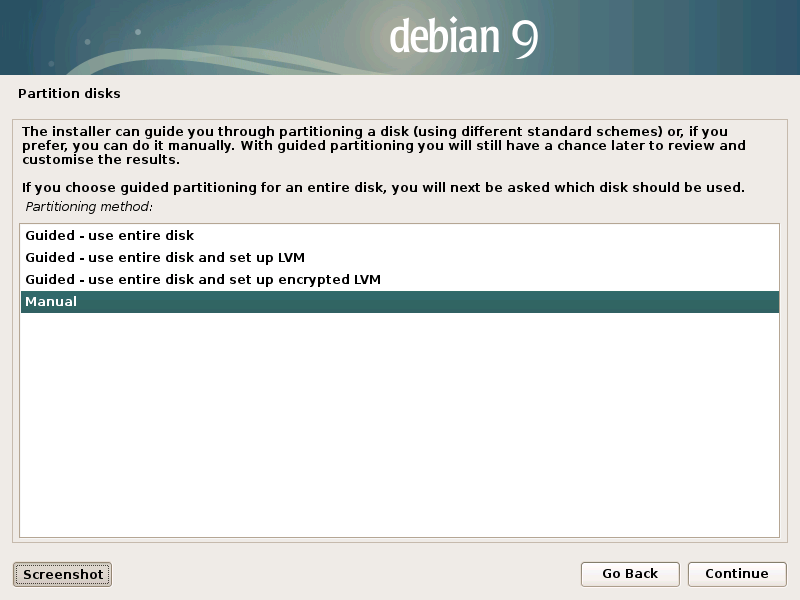
Debian-Installer showing an option for automated partitioning with LVM on LUKS

A common usage of LUKS is to provide full disk encryption, which involves encrypting the root partition of an operating system installation, which protects the operating system files from being tampered with or read by unauthorized parties.

On a Linux system, the boot partition (/boot) may be encrypted if the bootloader itself supports LUKS (e.g. GRUB). This is undertaken to prevent tampering with the Linux kernel. However, the first stage bootloader or an EFI system partition cannot be encrypted (see Full disk encryption#The boot key problem).

On mobile Linux systems, Nura has developed osk-sdl to allow a full disk encrypted system to be unlocked using a touch screen.

For systems running systemd, the systemd-homed component can be used to encrypt individual home directories.

== Operating system support ==
The reference implementation for LUKS operates on Linux and is based on an enhanced version of cryptsetup, using dm-crypt as the disk encryption backend. Under Microsoft Windows, LUKS-encrypted disks can be used via the Windows Subsystem for Linux. (Formerly, this was possible with LibreCrypt, which currently has fundamental security holes, and which succeeded FreeOTFE, formerly DoxBox.)

DragonFly BSD supports LUKS.

On macOS, anylinuxfs provides access to LUKS-formatted disks, as well as other formats.

=== Installer support ===
Several Linux distributions allow the root device to be encrypted upon OS installation. These installers include Calamares, Ubiquity, Debian-Installer, and more.

== On-disk format ==
LUKS headers are backward compatible; newer versions of LUKS are able to read headers of previous versions.

=== LUKS1 ===
LUKS1 Header
Offset		Data type	Description
0	0_{hex}	char[6]	Magic number {'L', 'U', 'K', 'S', 0xBA, 0xBE }
6	6_{hex}	uint16_t	LUKS Version (0x0001 for LUKS1)
8	8_{hex}	char[32]	Cipher Algorithm (e.g. "twofish", "aes")
40	28_{hex}	char[32]	Cipher mode (e.g. "cbc-essiv:sha256")
72	48_{hex}	char[32]	Cryptographic hash function (e.g. "sha1", "ripemd160")
104	68_{hex}	uint32_t	Payload offset (position of encrypted data) in 512 byte offsets
108	6C_{hex}	uint32_t	Number of key bytes
112	70_{hex}	char[20]	PBKDF2 master key checksum
132	84_{hex}	char[32]	PBKDF2 master key salt parameter
164	A4_{hex}	uint32_t	PBKDF2 master key iterations (Default: 10)
168	A8_{hex}	char[40]	UUID of the partition (e.g. "504c9fa7-d080-4acf-a829-73227b48fb89")
208	D0_{hex}	(48 Bytes)	Keyslot 1
…
544	220_{hex}	(48 Bytes)	Keyslot 8
592 Bytes total

Format of each keyslot
Offset	Data type	Description
0	uint32_t	State of keyslot: Active=0x00AC71F3; Disabled=0x0000DEAD
4	uint32_t	PBKDF2 iteration parameter
8	char[32]	PBKDF2 salt parameter
40	uint32_t	Start sector of key
44	uint32_t	Number of anti-forensic stripes (Default: 4000)
48 Bytes total

=== LUKS2 ===
The LUKS2 header has a binary area and a JSON area, a second binary and JSON area, and a keyslots area. The binary and JSON areas are repeated two times with minor variations.

==== Binary area ====
The size of the binary areas is always 4kiB. The size of binary plus JSON area can be a power-of-two number of bytes between 16 kiB and 4 MiB, making the size of the JSON areas between 12 kiB and 4092 kiB each.

LUKS2 binary and JSON header area (16 kiB each)
Offset		Data type	Description
1st Binary area
0	0_{hex}	char[6]	Magic number {'L', 'U', 'K', 'S', 0xBA, 0xBE }, allows fast detection by blkid
6	6_{hex}	uint16_t	LUKS Version (0x0002 for LUKS2)
8	8_{hex}	uint64_t	Size of binary and json area (commonly 16 kiB, 4000_{hex})
16	10_{hex}	uint64_t	Epoch, incremented when the header is modified
24	18_{hex}	char[48]	ASCII Partition Label, null terminated
72	48_{hex}	char[32]	String determining the checksum algorithm (commonly "sha256"), null terminated
104	68_{hex}	uint8_t[64]	Salt , unique for every binary area
168	A8_{hex}	char[40]	UUID of the device, null terminated (e.g. "02f47c64-7e74-4711-8bd4-a37613d1ecd3")
208	D0_{hex}	char[48]	Secondary "subsystem" label, null terminated
256	100_{hex}	uint64_t	offset of this LUKS area on the device (typically 0)
264	108_{hex}	_char[184]	Padding, must be zeroed
448	1C0_{hex}	uint8_t[64]	Checksum of 1st binary area calculated with the checksum algorithm, zero-padded if shorter
512	200_{hex}	_char[3584]	Padding, must be zeroed
1st JSON area
4096	1000_{hex}	char[12288]	LUKS JSON object, null terminated
2nd Binary area
16384	4000_{hex}	char[6]	Second Magic number {'S', 'K', 'U', 'L', 0xBA, 0xBE }
			Identical to 1st binary area
16488	4068_{hex}	uint8_t[64]	Salt, unique for every binary area
			Identical to 1st binary area
16640	4100_{hex}	uint64_t	offset of this LUKS area on the device (typically 4000_{hex}, 16384_{dec})
16648	4108_{hex}	_char[184]	Padding, must be zeroed
16832	41C0_{hex}	uint8_t[64]	Checksum of 2nd binary area calculated with the checksum algorithm, zero-padded if shorter
16896	4200_{hex}	_char[3584]	Padding, must be zeroed
2nd JSON area
			Identical to 1st JSON area
32 kiB total

==== JSON area ====
The base LUKS2 JSON metadata object has 5 keys: config, keyslots, digests, segments, and tokens.

Config contains general settings and information of the LUKS header, and persistent mount options.

Segments describe areas on the disk than contain data and can be decrypted. They also describe the algorithm with which a segment is encrypted.

Digests describe what keyslots contain encrypted keys able to decrypt which segments. They contain a hash of the decrypted key of the keyslot that functions as a checksum and to verify correctness of the password.

Keyslots contain encrypted keys. The method of encryption varies, a combination of passwords, keyfiles, hardware keys, and other methods can be uses to decrypt the contained master-keys.

The tokens object can hold additional for external systems integrating with LUKS.

Userdata, segments, are encrypted with a large master-key and an efficient encryption algorithm. The master key can then be encrypted with a more expensive algorithm and potentially weaker user-provided keys, these encrypted master-keys are then stored in Keyslots. This slows brute-force attempts at guessing the password, and also allows changing decryption methods and passwords without having to reencrypt the entire data section, by only needing to rewrite the same master-key encrypted differently into the keyslots.

A typical LUKS2 JSON area, with added indentation and line-breaks:

{
	"keyslots": {
		"0": {
			"type": "luks2",
			"key_size": 64,
			"af": {
				"type": "luks1",
				"stripes": 4000,
				"hash": "sha256"
			},
			"area": {
				"type": "raw",
				"offset": "32768",
				"size": "258048",
				"encryption": "aes-xts-plain64",
				"key_size": 64
			},
			"kdf": {
				"type": "argon2id",
				"time": 4,
				"memory": 1048576,
				"cpus": 4,
				"salt": "YOvmrBmgFT7Ehm7ANZrn0quep1fUFisNCv4e+X8+CLk="
			}
		}
	},
	"tokens": {},
	"segments": {
		"0": {
			"type": "crypt",
			"offset": "16777216",
			"size": "dynamic",
			"iv_tweak": "0",
			"encryption": "aes-xts-plain64",
			"sector_size": 512
		}
	},
	"digests": {
		"0": {
			"type": "pbkdf2",
			"keyslots": [
				"0"
			],
			"segments": [
				"0"
			],
			"hash": "sha256",
			"iterations": 105703,
			"salt": "hrSZ0Sh6t3EVAyeH7XLSH1dEQrRmJwimbjHx85PLS/k=",
			"digest": "tXiDNw8fanGe8QcXewvtzF3AOTOqaIXBmhAGa8Kb42w="
		}
	},
	"config": {
		"json_size": "12288",
		"keyslots_size": "16744448",
		"flags": [
				"allow-discards"
		]
	}
}

==== Keyslots area ====
Keyslots take up the device region after the two binary and JSON areas. In the typical case shown above this starts at 32 kiB, and runs up to 4 MiB or 16 MiB. Here we will use 16MiB as an example.

Usually a device is spanned by a single segment, with the offset set to 16MiB and the size to dynamic. During reencryption or in unusual configuration there might be multiple segments that in total should span the device without gaps or overlap.

The segment(s) should each have a single associated digest, that each have one or more associated keyslots. Keyslots may also be unassociated with any digest and used for other purposes.

Keyslots themselves are mapped into the keyslots area, in the example above to a single 252kiB area starting right after the header at 32 kiB. This area is obfuscated with anti-forensic stripes in the same manner as in LUKS1.

The default algorithm for digests, pbkdf2, as well as the anti-forensic stripes type "luks1", are identical to LUKS1. The key derivation defaults to stronger algorithms unsupported by LUKS1, but can be set to the supported pbkdf2.

== Examples ==
Cryptsetup is the reference implementation of the LUKS frontend.

To encrypt a device with the path /dev/sda1:

# cryptsetup luksFormat /dev/sda1

To unlock an encrypted device, where name is the mapped device name:

# cryptsetup open /dev/sda1 name

=== Re-encrypting ===
Re-encrypting a LUKS container can be done either with the cryptsetup tool itself, or with a legacy tool called cryptsetup-reencrypt. These tools can also be used to add encryption to an existing unencrypted filesystem, or remove encryption from a block device.

Both methods have similar syntax:

# cryptsetup reencrypt /dev/sda1

# cryptsetup-reencrypt /dev/sda1

== See also ==
- Comparison of disk encryption software
