= Disk-encryption software =

Computer security software

Disk-encryption software is a computer security software that protects the confidentiality of data stored on computer media (e.g., a hard disk, floppy disk, or USB device) by using disk encryption.

Compared to access controls commonly enforced by an operating system (OS), encryption passively protects data confidentiality even when the OS is not active, for example, if data is read directly from the hardware or by a different OS. In addition, crypto-shredding suppresses the need to erase the data at the end of the disk's lifecycle.

Disk encryption generally refers to wholesale encryption that operates on an entire volume mostly transparently to the user, the system, and applications. This is generally distinguished from file-level encryption that operates by user invocation on a single file or group of files, and which requires the user to decide which specific files should be encrypted. Disk encryption usually includes all aspects of the disk, including directories, so that an adversary cannot determine content, name or size of any file. It is well suited to portable devices such as laptop computers and thumb drives which are particularly susceptible to being lost or stolen. If used properly, someone finding a lost device cannot penetrate actual data, or even know what files might be present.

== Methods ==
The disk's data is protected using symmetric cryptography with the key randomly generated when a disk's encryption is first established. This key is itself encrypted in some way using a password or pass-phrase known (ideally) only to the user. Thereafter, in order to access the disk's data, the user must supply the password to make the key available to the software. This must be done sometime after each operating system start-up before the encrypted data can be used.

Done in software, encryption typically operates at a level between all applications and most system programs and the low-level device drivers by "transparently" (from a user's point of view) encrypting data after it is produced by a program but before it is physically written to the disk. Conversely, it decrypts data immediately after being read but before it is presented to a program. Properly done, programs are unaware of these cryptographic operations.

Some disk-encryption software (e.g., TrueCrypt or BestCrypt) provide features that generally cannot be accomplished with disk hardware encryption: the ability to mount "container" files as encrypted logical disks with their own file system; and encrypted logical "inner" volumes which are secretly hidden within the free space of the more obvious "outer" volumes. Such strategies provide plausible deniability.

Well-known examples of disk-encryption software include, BitLocker for Windows; FileVault for Apple OS/X; LUKS a standard free software mainly for Linux and TrueCrypt, a non-commercial freeware application, for Windows, OS/X and Linux.

- A 2008 study found data remanence in dynamic random access memory (DRAM), with data retention of seconds to minutes at room temperature and much longer times when memory chips were cooled to low temperature. The study authors were able to demonstrate a cold boot attack to recover cryptographic keys for several popular disk-encryption systems despite some memory degradation, by taking advantage of redundancy in the way keys are stored after they have been expanded for efficient use. The authors recommend that computers be powered down, rather than be left in a "sleep" state, when not under physical control by the computer's legitimate owner. This method of key recovery, however, is suited for controlled laboratory settings and is extremely impractical for "field" use due to the equipment and cooling systems required.

== Other features ==
=== Plausible deniability ===
Some disk-encryption systems, such as VeraCrypt, CipherShed (active open source forks of the discontinued TrueCrypt project), BestCrypt (proprietary trialware), offer levels of plausible deniability, which might be useful if a user is compelled to reveal the password of an encrypted volume.

=== Hidden volumes ===
Hidden volumes are a steganographic feature that allows a second, "hidden", volume to reside within the apparent free space of a visible "container" volume (sometimes known as "outer" volume). The hidden volume has its own separate file system, password, and encryption key distinct from the container volume.

The content of the hidden volume is encrypted and resides in the free space of the file system of the outer volume—space which would otherwise be filled with random values if the hidden volume did not exist. When the outer container is brought online through the disk-encryption software, whether the inner or outer volume is mounted depends on the password provided. If the "normal" password/key of the outer volume proves valid, the outer volume is mounted; if the password/key of the hidden volume proves valid, then (and only then) can the existence of the hidden volume even be detected, and it is mounted; otherwise if the password/key does not successfully decrypt either the inner or outer volume descriptors, then neither is mounted.

Once a hidden volume has been created inside the visible container volume, the user will store important-looking information (but which the user does not actually mind revealing) on the outer volume, whereas more sensitive information is stored within the hidden volume.

If the user is forced to reveal a password, the user can reveal the password to the outer volume, without disclosing the existence of the hidden volume. The hidden volume will not be compromised, if the user takes certain precautions in overwriting the free areas of the "host" disk.

=== No identifying features ===
Volumes, be they stored in a file or a device/partition, may intentionally not contain any discernible "signatures" or unencrypted headers. As cipher algorithms are designed to be indistinguishable from a pseudorandom permutation without knowing the key, the presence of data on the encrypted volume is also undetectable unless there are known weaknesses in the cipher. This means that it is impossible to prove that any file or partition is an encrypted volume (rather than random data) without having the password to mount it. This characteristic also makes it impossible to determine if a volume contains another hidden volume.

A file hosted volume (as opposed to partitions) may look out of place in some cases since it will be entirely random data placed in a file intentionally. However, a partition or device hosted volume will look no different from a partition or device that has been wiped with a common disk wiping tool such as Darik's Boot and Nuke. One can plausibly claim that such a device or partition has been wiped to clear personal data.

Portable or "traveller mode" means the encryption software can be run without installation to the system hard drive. In this mode, the software typically installs a temporary driver from the portable media. Since it is installing a driver (albeit temporarily), administrative privileges are still required.

=== Backups ===
Encrypted volumes contain "header" (or "CDB") data, which may be backed up. Overwriting these data will destroy the volume, so the ability to back them up is useful.

Restoring the backup copy of these data may reset the volume's password to what it was when the backup was taken.

== See also ==
- Comparison of disk encryption software
- Cold boot attack
- Data remanence
- Disk encryption theory
- On-the-fly encryption
- Ransomware
- Single sign-on
- United States v. Boucher
