= List of cryptographic software =

This is a list of cryptographic software, including software, libraries, protocols, algorithms, services, and operating-system components used for cryptography, encryption, digital signatures, authentication, secure communication, disk encryption, public-key infrastructure, and related functions.

== Email and OpenPGP encryption software ==
- Android Privacy Guard
- Apple Mail
- Autocrypt
- Claws Mail
- Enigmail
- GNU Privacy Guard
- GPG Mail
- Gpg4win
- Hushmail
- Kontact
- Mailfence
- Mailvelope
- Outlook
- Thunderbird
- OpenKeychain
- Pretty Easy privacy
- Pretty Good Privacy
- Proton Mail
- Sylpheed
- WinPT

== Secure messaging, voice, and communication software ==
- Adium
- BBM Enterprise
- BitlBee
- Bitmessage
- Briar
- Centericq
- ChatSecure
- climm
- Confide
- Cryptocat
- Facebook Messenger
- Google Allo
- Google Messages
- Jami
- Jitsi
- Kopete
- Linphone
- Matrix
- Nautilus (secure telephone)
- Off-the-Record Messaging protocol
- Olvid (software)
- OMEMO
- Peerio
- PGPfone
- Phoner
- PhonerLite
- Profanity
- RetroShare
- Session (software)
- Signal
- Signal Protocol
- Silence (software)
- Silent Circle (software)
- SimpleX Chat
- TeamNote
- Teamwire
- TextSecure
- Threema
- Tox
- Twinkle (software)
- WhatsApp
- Wire (software)
- Proteus
- Xx messenger
- Zfone

== Secure Shell, secure transfer, and tunneling software ==
- AbsoluteTelnet
- Core FTP
- Corkscrew (program)
- Dropbear
- lsh
- OpenSSH
- PuTTY
- Secure copy protocol
- SecureCRT
- ssh-agent
- Stunnel
- Tera Term
- WinSCP
- wolfSSH

== TLS and SSL implementations ==
- BoringSSL
- Botan
- Bouncy Castle
- BSAFE
- cryptlib
- CyaSSL+
- GnuTLS
- JSSE
- LibreSSL
- MatrixSSL
- mbed TLS
- Network Security Services
- OpenSSL
- S2n-tls
- SChannel
- SSLeay
- wolfSSL
- XySSL
- YaSSL

== VPN software, protocols, and services ==
=== VPN software and protocols ===
- Check Point VPN-1
- KAME project
- Hamachi
- Openswan
- OpenVPN
- SoftEther VPN
- strongSwan
- Tailscale
- Tinc
- UT-VPN
- VNS3
- WireGuard

=== VPN services ===
- Atlas VPN
- Avast SecureLine VPN
- BlackVPN
- ExpressVPN
- Guardian Firewall
- HMA (VPN)
- Hola (VPN)
- Hotspot Shield
- IPredator
- IPVanish
- IVPN
- KeepSolid VPN Unlimited
- Mullvad
- NordLayer
- NordVPN
- PrivadoVPN
- Private Internet Access
- Proton VPN
- PureVPN
- SaferVPN
- Surfshark VPN
- TunnelBear
- VPNBook
- VPNLab
- Windscribe

== Disk encryption and encrypted file systems ==
- BestCrypt
- BitLocker
- CipherShed
- Cryptoloop
- Cryptomator
- Cryptsetup
- dm-crypt
- DriveSentry
- E4M
- eCryptfs
- EncFS
- Encrypting File System
- FileVault
- FreeOTFE
- GBDE
- geli
- LUKS
- NordLocker
- PGPDisk
- PGP Whole Disk Encryption
- Private Disk
- Rubberhose
- Scramdisk
- Sentry 2020
- StegFS
- Tahoe-LAFS
- TrueCrypt
- VeraCrypt

== General encryption software and utilities ==
- ACE Encrypt
- Acid Cryptofiler
- Ccrypt
- CipherSaber
- Crypt (Unix)
- CryptoBuddy
- CryptoGraf
- GNU fcrypt
- Mcrypt
- OpenPuff
- Rclone

== Cryptographic libraries and APIs ==
- Botan
- Bouncy Castle
- BSAFE
- CAPICOM
- Crypto API (Linux)
- Crypto++
- cryptlib
- Data Protection API
- GnuTLS
- IAIK-JCE
- Java Cryptography Architecture
- Java Cryptography Extension
- Libgcrypt
- LibreSSL
- MatrixSSL
- Mbed TLS
- Microsoft CryptoAPI
- NaCl (software)
- libsodium
- Nettle
- Network Security Services
- OpenBSD Cryptographic Framework
- OpenSSL
- S2n-tls
- wolfCrypt
- WolfSSL

== Public-key infrastructure, certificates, and smart-card software ==
- EJBCA
- GnoMint
- OpenSC
- OpenXPKI

== Password managers and authentication software ==
- Bitwarden
- Dashlane
- Everykey
- Google Authenticator
- KeePass
- KeeWeb
- KWallet
- LastPass
- Microsoft Authenticator
- Mitro
- OTPW
- Pleasant Password Server
- Rublon
- S/KEY
- Seahorse

== Anonymity, privacy networks, and private storage services ==
- Flash proxy
- GNUnet
- Hyphanet
- I2P
- Java Anon Proxy
- Proton Drive
- Ricochet
- Tor
- Tor Browser
- Tresorit
- Vidalia
- Wickr
- Wuala

== Homomorphic encryption and research software ==
- CrypTool
- HElib
- Microsoft SEAL
- OpenFHE
- PALISADE (software)

== Cryptography languages ==
- Cryptol

== Cryptography verification tools ==
- CryptoVerif
- ProVerif
- Tamarin Prover

== Security-focused operating systems and platforms ==
- Bitfrost
- GrapheneOS
- Next-Generation Secure Computing Base
- OpenBSD
- Qubes
- Subgraph OS
- Tails
- Tinfoil Hat Linux
- Whonix

== Anti-forensics and physical-security utilities ==
- BusKill
- USBKill

== Cryptographic algorithms and primitives ==
- Advanced Encryption Standard
- Argon2
- Beaufort cipher
- Bcrypt
- BLAKE (hash function)
- Block cipher mode of operation
- Blowfish (cipher)
- ChaCha20-Poly1305
- Cryptographic hash function
- Cryptographically secure pseudorandom number generator
- Curve25519
- Data Encryption Standard
- Diffie–Hellman key exchange
- Double Ratchet Algorithm
- EdDSA
- Elliptic-curve cryptography
- Elliptic-curve Diffie–Hellman
- ECDSA
- Equihash
- Feistel cipher
- Hash chain
- HMAC
- HMAC-based one-time password
- Key schedule
- Key wrap
- L3cos
- Linear-feedback shift register
- MD5
- Merkle tree
- Modular exponentiation
- Montgomery modular multiplication
- One-time pad
- PBKDF2
- Poly1305
- RSA
- S-box
- Salsa20
- Scrypt
- Secret sharing
- SHA-1
- SHA-2
- SHA-3
- Substitution–permutation network
- Symmetric-key algorithm
- Time-based one-time password
- Twofish
- Verifiable random function

== Cryptocurrency wallets, clients, and privacy protocols ==
=== Cryptocurrency wallet and client software ===
- Bitcoin Core
- Bitkey
- Electrum
- Exodus Wallet
- MetaMask

=== Privacy-focused cryptocurrencies and protocols ===
- Dash
- Firo
- Monero
- Zcash
- Zerocoin protocol

=== Blockchain interoperability protocols ===
- Hyperbridge

== Quantum and post-quantum cryptography ==
=== Quantum key distribution protocols ===
- B92 protocol
- BB84
- BBM92 protocol
- Decoy state
- High-dimensional quantum key distribution
- KMB09 protocol
- MSZ96
- SARG04
- Six-state protocol

=== Post-quantum algorithms and standards ===
- Falcon
- Hash-based cryptography
- Lattice-based cryptography
- McEliece cryptosystem
- ML-KEM
- NTRU
- NTRUEncrypt
- NTRUSign
- Ring learning with errors
- Ring learning with errors key exchange
- Ring learning with errors signature
- SPHINCS+

== Other cryptographic and security software ==
- Debian — general-purpose Linux distribution that includes many cryptographic libraries, tools, and packages.
- Libdvdcss — library for decrypting DVD-Video discs.
- Mujahedeen Secrets — encryption software associated with jihadist communications.
- Sichere Inter-Netzwerk Architektur — German secure networking architecture.
- Sha1sum — command-line utility for computing SHA-1 hashes.
- Syskey — former Windows utility for encrypting account-password data.

== See also ==
- Cryptographic hash function
- Disk encryption theory
- List of cypherpunk software
- List of cryptographers
- List of hash functions
- Outline of cryptography
- Password Hashing Competition
- Secure Shell
- Steganography tools
- Timeline of cryptography

=== Cryptography organizations and communities ===
- Cypherpunks
- Electronic Frontier Foundation
- Guardian Project
