= VNS3 =

Virtual appliance

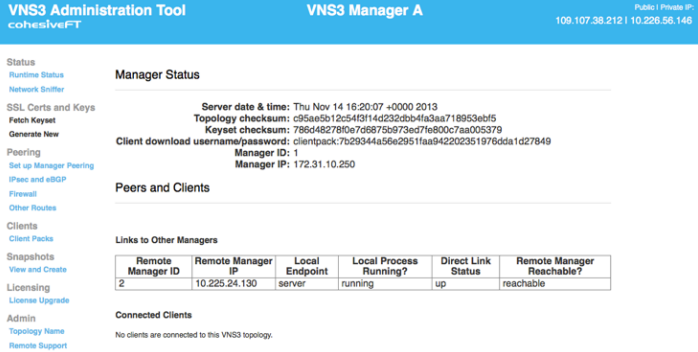
- VNS3 web user interface
- Developer: Cohesive Networks
- Release: June 2006; 20 years ago
- Stable release: v4.8.4, available for free in some cloud providers, paid subscription / 21 May 2017; 9 years ago
- Website: https://www.cohesive.net

VNS3 is a software-only virtual appliance that allows users to control access and network topology and secure data in motion across public and private clouds. VNS3 is a virtual router, switch, firewall, protocol re-distributor, and SSL/IPSec VPN concentrator. The Network Virtualization Software creates a customer-controlled overlay network over top of the underlying network backbone.

== Uses ==
VNS3 is a network routing and security virtual appliance that lets extend networks into public, private, and hybrid clouds VNS3 lets enterprise data center administrators "create encrypted LAN between virtual machines in a private cloud, as well as encrypted WAN across multiple public clouds."

== History ==
Developers Cohesive Networks first named their multi-sourced infrastructure concept "v-cube-v." The software ran in internal production starting in 2007. The company named the early commercial version of VNS3 "VPN3" or "VPN-Cubed" and later renamed the software to VNS3 in 2012.

Amazon Web Services users first began downloading VPN-Cubed from the partner directory on 5 December 2008. VNS3 gained popularity (as VPN-Cubed) as part of the Amazon Web Services public cloud ecosystem and with independent reviews from ZDNet, High Scalability, InfoQ, Chris Hoff, and CloudAve.

In 2012, developers Cohesive Networks released a major version update. The release updated the software to 3.0 and rebranded it as VNS3 (VNS-Cubed). 451 Research analyst William Fellows wrote "VNS[3] is not only for VPNs – hence the name change – since overlays can be within a cloud, between clouds, between a private datacenter and a cloud (or clouds), or between multiple datacenters."

In 2013, Cohesive Networks released a 3.0.1 version of the product, as well as a free edition of VNS3 in Amazon Web Services. VNS3 was recognized in the 6th Annual International Datacenters Awards as the winner of the Public Cloud Services & Infrastructure award In early 2014 VNS3 3.5 was released with major software updates and a new integration with Docker Docker's open-source virtualization platform added the ability to run other networking applications as containers inside VNS3 virtual machines. Users can create an overlay network "as a substrate for layer 4-7 network application services – things like proxy, reverse proxy, SSL termination, content caching and network intrusion detection" William Fellows writes.

In early 2015 the company renamed to Cohesive Networks to emphasize the networking capabilities of VNS3 and to spin off the less successful part of the business. The company later announced a new line of VNS3-based products, including VNS3:turret application segmentation controller, the VNS3:ms network management platform, and the VNS3:ha - high availability add on.

After 2008, VNS3 became available in more public cloud providers and geographic regions, including Amazon Web Services EC2, GoGrid, Flexiant, IBM SoftLayer, Google Compute Engine, HP Cloud Services, Mircorsoft Azure, and CenturyLink Cloud.

== Software ==
VNS3 software creates IPSec tunneling connections similar to a site to site VPN. The connections can ensure a single LAN connection between virtual or cloud environments VNS3 gives secure access to cloud assets, extends the Virtual LAN segmentation, isolation, and security of a cloud provider's network.

The first VNS3 was built on a customized Ubuntu-based Linux using open source networking applications Openswan and OpenVPN. The development team chose OpenVPN "primarily because it uses standard OpenSSL encryption, runs on multiple operating systems and does not require kernel patching or additional modules."
VNS3 Managers are virtual machines that act as a VPN gateway for the other virtual machines in the same cloud infrastructure. VNS3 synchronizes between cloud managers using RabbitMQ. VNS3 enables users to turn multicast on and off in order to work on public clouds, allowing software configurations dependent on multicast to function in the cloud.

VNS3 software creates IPSec tunneling connections similar to a site-to-site VPN. The connections can ensure a single LAN network between multiple cloud environments. VNS3 secures connections to cloud deployments, extends the Virtual LAN segmentation, and ensures network isolation and security in a cloud provider's virtual environment. VNS3 has a web-based UI and traditional Linux system command line interface. The VNS3 API uses a Ruby script and Ruby language binding.

The developers earned a patent on the underlying cloud VPN technologies in 2010.

== Availability ==
VPN-Cubed has been available in Amazon Web Services cloud since December 5, 2008.
According to the Cohesive Networks website, VNS3 is delivered as a virtual machine and is available in public clouds including: Amazon Web Services, Microsoft Azure, Google Compute Engine, ElasticHosts, IBM SoftLayer, and CenturyLink Cloud. Private clouds availability includes: Abiquo, Eucalyptus, Openstack; and virtual infrastructures such as: Xen, VMware, KVM, Citrix.

=== Pricing ===
Since October 2008, VNS3 has been available for free on Amazon Web Services Microsoft Azure, and CenturyLink Cloud. Additional paid editions are listed on the Cohesive Networks website.

=== Release History ===
Version number	Release date	Status	Major changes	Available in	Notes
4.3.2 - 4.3.5	21 May 2017	Current	Support for AWS BYOL Marketplace image added. Support for Google Cloud Marketplace (Launcher) added. Alpha Release of firewall enhancements supporting customer created subchains and firewall host and port sets. Improved memory utilization information via UI and API by taking into account what the VNS3 linux-based OS is caching/buffering. Improved CPU load information on the VNS3 Status page.	Public clouds Amazon Web Services, Microsoft Azure, ElasticHosts, CenturyLink Cloud, IBM SoftLayer Google Cloud Platform; Private clouds and virtual infrastructures: Xen, VMware, KVM, Citrix	Ongoing updates to 4.0.x releases with security patches
4.0 - 4.3.1	29 September 2016	End of sale 15 August 2017, End of life 15 November 2017	VNS3 Version 4 is a major release in the lifecycle of the VNS3 product family. Version 4 will be the foundation for a sequence of feature dot releases in the near future, including an update of the VNS3 hardened OS to version 4.0. and a redesigned UI to take advantage of paginated, sortable and searchable tables for Peered connections, Overlay Network devices, Clientpacks, and IPsec tunnels; and new configurable HTTPS certificates for Web UI and API access.	Public clouds Amazon Web Services, Microsoft Azure, ElasticHosts, CenturyLink Cloud, IBM SoftLayer Google Cloud Platform; Private clouds and virtual infrastructures: Xen, VMware, KVM, Citrix	Ongoing updates to 4.0.x releases without security patches
3.5.3 LTS	31 July 2017	Current Long Term Server (LTS) version	This release comes ahead of the 4.0 release and will be the “Long Term Server” version for the 3.5 product line.	Public clouds Amazon Web Services, Microsoft Azure, ElasticHosts, CenturyLink Cloud, IBM SoftLayer Google Cloud Platform; Private clouds: Abiquo Enterprise Edition, Eucalyptus (computing), Openstack; virtual infrastructures: Xen, VMware, KVM, Citrix	First VNS3 Long Term Server
3.5.1.14	18 March 2016	End of sale 15 August 2017, End of life 15 November 2017	Allows use of an instance as an HA backup controller via the VNS3:ms system. Disabled SSLv3 for security fixes. Interface Routes now take an optional gateway specification. Overlay server can use jumbo frames when available via change to client side config file. Allow PREROUTING_CUST and POSTROUTING_CUST customer firewall chains to use and valid jump target for the NAT table.	Public clouds Amazon Web Services, Microsoft Azure, ElasticHosts, CenturyLink Cloud, IBM SoftLayer Google Cloud Platform; Private clouds: Abiquo Enterprise Edition, Eucalyptus (computing), Openstack; virtual infrastructures: Xen, VMware, KVM, Citrix	Final update to 3.5 dot release line
3.5 - 3.5.1.13	30 January 2014 - 30 April 2014	End of sale 18 March 2016, End of life 15 November 2017	A series of dot releases following the major 3.5 release in January 2014 to address feedback from customers on the overall release. Updates to the Docker based L4-L7 container system and to support VNS3:turret in private clouds and virtual infrastructures. Bug fixes and security responses were included in almost every minor update.	Public clouds Amazon Web Services, HP Cloud Services, Google Compute Engine, ElasticHosts, Flexiant Limited, Interoute, Softlayer; Private clouds: Abiquo Enterprise Edition, Eucalyptus (computing), Openstack; virtual infrastructures: Xen, VMware, KVM, Citrix	Minor ongoing updates to 3.5 release
3.0 - 3.0.4	12 September 2012 - 26 November 2013	End of sale 20 November 2015, End of life 20 April 2016	Network sniffer Packet analyzer, IPsec visibility and monitoring in the API and User Interface; License Upgrade program for immediate upgrades; updated API, expanded Representational state transfer API	Available for most cloud providers, bespoke pricing	Major release including new user interface, and rebranding change that renamed the older v2.x VPN-Cubed product to VNS3
2.x	17 November 2010	Historical, no longer supported	Manager Virtual firewall, Manager API compatibility, external ping capability, Cloud Only edition and Datacenter Connect edition	Private clouds: Terremark, Eucalyptus (computing), RightScale, Openstack; virtual infrastructures: Xen, VMware, KVM, Citrix; and public clouds Amazon Web Services, GoGrid, Flexiant Limited, IBM cloud computing	First commercial version, named VPN-Cubed
1.x	June 2006	Historical, no longer supported	First versions were named v-cube-v and tested internally. As the software became commercially available, Cohesive Networks renamed it VPN-Cubed	Terremark, Eucalyptus (computing), RightScale, Xen, VMware, KVM, Amazon Web Services,	First version
