= CPT (file format) =

- Filename extension: .cpt
- Developed by: Corel
- Type of format: proprietary raster image format

.cpt is a filename extension denoting one of several different kinds of files:

- A graphics file format used by some versions of Corel Photo Paint. It is also possible to open CPT version 6 files with IrfanView, but not with Paint Shop Pro (although it is from Corel). CPT version 6 is an almost identical copy of the TIFF format, whereas since Corel Photo-Paint 7.0 (released in 1997), this was deprecated for a new proprietary format (known as CPT7), however the user can still export the older TIFF-based CPT6 files. Chasys Draw IES can open CPT7 files as well as CPT8 and the latest CPT9; this support is available as from Chasys Draw IES version 4.58.01 . Corel Photo Paint is not released as a standalone program. It is part of the Corel Draw Graphics Suite, available for Windows and Mac.
- The .cpt extension is used for files encrypted using ccrypt.
- .cpt is used for screen captures in the video game Tekken Tag Tournament (PlayStation 2), which are saved to the Memory Card.
- .cpt was a filename extension used by a popular software data compression utility named Compact Pro in pre-OS X operating systems for Macintosh. A PC version was also available, ExtractorPC. Neither program is actively supported.
