= Abiquo Enterprise Edition =

Hybrid Cloud Management Platform

Abiquo
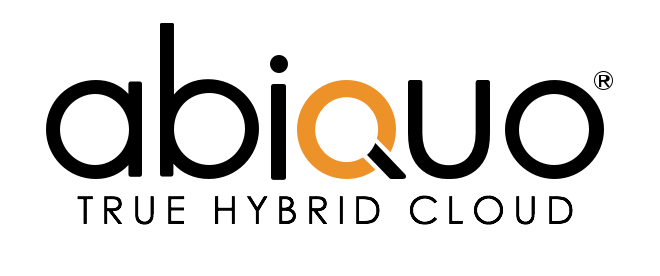
- Abiquo True Hybrid Cloud Logo
- Developer: Abiquo
- Stable release: 4.5
- Written in: Java
- Operating system: Linux
- Platform: Hypervisors
- Type: Cloud computing
- License: Proprietary commercial software
- Website: abiquo.com

Abiquo Hybrid Cloud Management Platform is a web-based cloud computing software platform developed by Abiquo. Written entirely in Java, it is used to build, integrate and manage public and private clouds in homogeneous environments. Users can deploy and manage servers, storage system and network and virtual devices. It also supports LDAP integration.

== Hypervisors ==
Abiquo supports five hypervisor systems.

- VMware ESXi
- Microsoft Hyper-V
- Citrix XenServer
- Oracle VM Server for x86
- KVM

From version 3.1, it also supports multiple public cloud providers:

- Amazon AWS
- Rackspace
- Google Compute Engine
- HP Cloud
- ElasticHosts
- DigitalOcean

Abiquo version 3.2 added:

- Microsoft Azure

Abiquo version 3.4 added:

- Support for Docker hosts, adding multi-tenant networking, storage management and private registry management for Docker
- SoftLayer
- CloudSigma

Later versions continued to add features including autoscaling on any cloud, integration to VMware NSX and OpenStack Neutron for software defined networking, guest config with cloud-init and integrated monitoring driving guest automation.

== Storage services ==
Abiquo supports any vendor for hypervisor storage, and also supports tiered storage pools, enabling storage-as-a-service from specific vendors and technologies including:

- NFS
- Generic iSCSI
- NetApp
- Nexenta

== SAAS version ==
In April 2014 Abiquo launched Abiquo anyCloud, a SAAS version of the Abiquo Hybrid Cloud Platform software. This version lets users manage public cloud resources from:

- Amazon AWS
- Microsoft Azure
- IBM SoftLayer
- DigitalOcean
- Rackspace Open Cloud (an OpenStack cloud)
- HP Public Cloud (an OpenStack cloud)
- Google Compute Engine
- ElasticHosts

Additional security and process features include workflow, to have an enterprise administrator electronically sign off on changes, an audit trail of activity and the ability to share cloud accounts among and enterprise team in a secure way.

== Reviews and awards ==
- Finalist for the 2015 Cloud Awards
- Finalist for the 2015 UK Cloud Awards in the category Cloud Management Product of the Year
- EMA Radar for Private Cloud platforms 2013
- Global Telecoms Business Innovation Summit and Awards 2013 (with Interoute)
- EuroCloud UK Awards
