= SoftEther Corporation =

Japanese software company

SoftEther Corporation is a Japanese software company. It was founded as an industry-academia-government venture in April 2004 by University of Tsukuba students, with the goal to develop the software of the same name, SoftEther VPN. The name indicated that a software emulates an Ethernet.

== Related software ==
=== SoftEther ===
The VPN software called SoftEther (SoftEther 1.0) was written by Daiyu Nobori, who became the Representative Director and chairman of the new company. In 2003, the software's development was adopted as one of the projects of the Exploratory Youth program, sponsored by Information Technology Promotion Agency, Japan. "In addition to being highly evaluated by the project manager, there were 1 million downloads in three months after making it available at the website."

The first SoftEther sales version was released in August 2004 called SoftEther CA, by Mitsubishi Materials Corporation, Japan.

=== PacketiX VPN ===
The second version of the software, released in December 2005, the name of the software was changed to PacketiX VPN 2.0 from SoftEther 2.0. In 2006, PacketiX VPN 2.0 won the "Software of the Year" award from the Innovation Platform Agency, Japan.

In 2010 March, PacketiX VPN 3.0 was released by SoftEther Corporation. Some functions were added to new version (as examples: support IPv6, 802.1Q VLAN, TLS 1.0). This version is compatible with PacketiX VPN 2.0.

In 2013 July, PacketiX VPN 4.0 was released by SoftEther Corporation. In this version, some existent protocols support was added.

=== UT-VPN ===
In 2010 June, UT-VPN was released by SoftEther Corporation and University of Tsukuba. UT-VPN is an open source VPN software. UT-VPN has compatible as PacketiX VPN products of SoftEther Corporation.

UT-VPN developed based on PacketiX VPN 3.0, but some functions was deleted. For example, the RADIUS client is supported by PacketiX VPN Server, but it is not supported by UT-VPN Server.

=== SoftEther VPN ===
In 2013 July, SoftEther VPN was released by SoftEther VPN Project with SoftEther Corporation and University of Tsukuba.

SoftEther VPN 1.0 developed based on PacketiX VPN 4.0. Compatibility and the restrictions of functions follow UT-VPN.

On January 4, 2014, SoftEther VPN announced that the source code of SoftEther VPN was released as open-source software under the GPLv2 license. SoftEther VPN is the underlying VPN engine of VPN Gate.

== See also ==
- SoftEther VPN
- UT-VPN
