= BlackVPN =

blackVPN was a VPN service offered by the Hong Kong–based company BlackVPN Limited. blackVPN featured AES-256 encryption and DNS leak protection. The service offered apps or manual configurations for Windows, Mac, iOS, Android, Linux, and routers. The company also maintained a strict no-logging policy.

== History ==
blackVPN was founded in 2009.

In March 2019, blackVPN ran 31 remote servers in 20 locations and 18 countries, including Australia, Canada, Japan, United Kingdom and United States.

== Threat ==
In April 2016, blackVPN claimed to have received blackmail from the Armada Collective hacker group. According to blackVPN, the group threatened to perform a DDoS attack against their VPN servers on April 25 if the ransom of 10.08 bitcoins was not paid.

blackVPN also stated that two other VPN service providers had received the same e-mail on April 18 and that VPN service provider AirVPN had suffered a similar threat and attack on May 30. At that time, it was unclear whether the sender of the e-mails simply imitated the group or indeed was Armada Collective.

On April 25, DDoS mitigation provider Cloudflare called out the threats as fake, stating that not a single attack was launched against a threatened organization.

== Reception ==
In March 2016, the Dutch computer magazine Computer!Totaal (C!T) listed blackVPN as one of the nine best VPN services available. However, C!T noted the service's relatively high price and lack of own client as potential downsides.

In July 2017, Engadget author Violet Blue mentioned blackVPN as one of the "names that come up as trusted" in the VPN service industry.

TorrentFreak interviewed blackVPN in their annual comparison of VPN providers from 2011 until blackVPN discontinued.

== See also ==
- Comparison of virtual private network services
