= Chasys Photo =

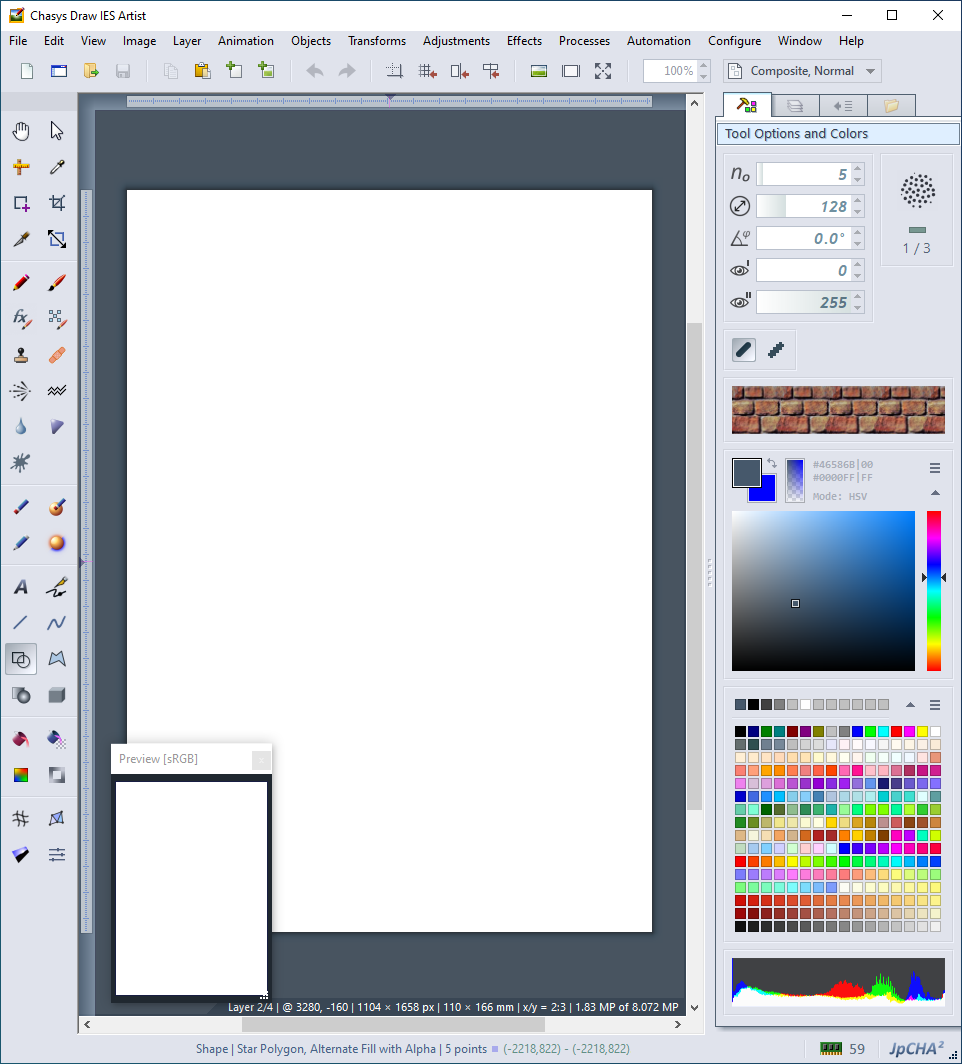
- Chasys Draw IES on Windows 10
- Original author: John Paul Chacha
- Developer: John Paul Chacha's Lab
- Stable release: 5.35.01 / 17 April 2025; 14 months ago
- Written in: C, C++ and assembly language
- Operating system: Windows XP and above
- Size: 38.3 MB
- Type: Raster graphics editor
- License: Freeware
- Website: www.jpchacha.com/chasysphoto/

Chasys Photo (previously called Chasys Draw Artist, then Chasys Draw IES) is a suite of applications including a layer-based raster graphics editor with adjustment layers, linked layers, timeline and frame-based animation, icon editing, image stacking and comprehensive plug-in support (Chasys Draw IES Artist), a fast multi-threaded image file converter (Chasys Draw IES Converter) and a fast image viewer (Chasys Draw IES Viewer), with RAW image support in all components. It supports the native file formats of several competitors including Adobe Photoshop, Affinity Photo, Corel Photo-Paint, GIMP, Krita, Paint.NET and PaintShop Pro, and the whole suite is designed to make effective use of multi-core processors, touch-screens and pen-input devices.

The software is developed by John Paul Chacha in Nairobi, Kenya.

Chasys Draw IES is currently released as freeware, and is available for computers running Microsoft Windows operating systems. It is available in three distributions: the standard distro, a portable version and a Microsoft Store version.

The suite is coded in a blend of C, C++ and assembly language. It runs on x86 processors and supports the MMX, SSE, SSE2, S-SSE3, and SSE4.1 instruction sets.

== History ==
Chasys Draw is a project that was started in November 2001 by John Paul Chacha, mostly as a hobby than anything else. The original Chasys Draw was a rather simple bitmap editor done in Visual Basic, a lot like Microsoft Paint save for its ability to do gradients. This application underwent many changes, eventually leading up to Chasys Draw 5. This was the first version to have its own native format, referred to simply as CD5.

Major updates to the graphics code in May 2002 resulted in Chasys Draw DTFx (Direct Tool eFfects). The new graphics code being referred to here was actually a miniature bitmap abstraction engine that allowed for fast per-pixel operations and direct image buffer access (much as the DIB engine does for GDI). The engine was named JpDRAW. This version was also done in VB, but was much faster than all the previous versions. The new graphics code allowed for more tools to be implemented than was ever possible before. Later on in 2002, the developer decided to completely abandon VB as a programming platform and moved all the code to C/C++. The move to C/C++ allowed the development of a full-fledged graphics engine which was named JpDRAW2. Chasys was renamed to Chasys Draw Artist, and the CD5 image format was also updated to reflect the new features. By coincidence, the module that implemented the file format was the fifth module to be added, so the format was called Chasys Draw module 5, retaining the .cd5 file extension.

First public release

In April 2004, Chasys Draw Artist was released to the public via the internet for the first time (version 1.27). The release was done via betanews). In 2005, Chasys Draw underwent major user interface changes as well as internal changes. By December of that year, the project had reached version 1.63. This was the first version to introduce advanced features such as anti-aliasing. It was also the first version with full support for alpha channels. The CD5 image format was also upgraded to version 2, adding advanced compression, full alpha channels, encryption and metadata. Version 1.63 was the first version to win an IEEE (Kenya chapter) award in ICT.

The "chazy-glass" interface, from which the all later versions' user interfaces borrowed, was introduced in version 1.80. Chasys Draw Artist adopted photo editing features in version 2.01. Comprehensive tutorials were added and many features were re-designed to make them easier to use. Multi-threading was introduced to accelerate some tasks, such as the improved auto-save engine. Utilities such as a converter and browser were added. Version 2.43 of Chasys Draw Artist was quietly released to the public in late 2007 without any announcements. It featured many fixes to the formal version 2.42, as well as many new features. The quiet release was due to a decision to re-build Chasys Draw Artist from scratch, while still continuing support for the old architecture. An experimental version 2.45 was released only to beta-testers for the purpose of testing new technologies that would be included in the new architecture and was officially withdrawn in May 2008.

During the time when the versions 2.43~2.45 were being released, work was underway to create a new layer-based Chasys Draw, which was released as Chasys Draw IES (Image Editing Suite), with the initial version number 2.50. A new multi-layer tag-based image format was created to support layering and blending modes; this was named CD5 v3. The next version introduced animation and multi-resolution support as editing modes, and the next one brought in an unlimited undo engine, new plug-ins and several internal fixes. Further development led to the introduction of super-resolution and image stacking, support for video and video capture, Anti-aliasing, metadata save and restore, a "Pen and Path" tool, physical measurement specification, and a video sequence composer engine. The user interface was enhanced with adaptive scrolling and the auto-save engine was optimized. Some memory management was added for machines with low RAM.

By version 2.60, Chasys Draw IES was capable of loading Photoshop's PSD files, as well as load and save JPEG 2000. This version also had shell integration with thumbnails and application-level support for multi-monitor display setups. Metadata was extended to support save, restore and scaling for text formatting and path data. There was also a new palette with exchangeable swatches, loadable from all kinds of palette files. A slicing tool for web and user interface design was also included. A C++ code module output for inline image generation was added, as was a constrained recolor brush.

The concept of a "fully anti-aliased work-flow" was introduced in version 2.62, in which all drawing and selection tools were anti-aliased by default. Support for Photoshop plug-ins using Adobe's 8bf format was added in version 2.66, allowing users to utilize thousands of free plug-ins available online. Equivalents for the Pantone palettes (PMS 100 to 814-2x) were added, and the "Just-in-Time" memory compressor significantly reduced the editor's memory requirements.

First freeware release

Chasys Draw IES went freeware on 6 June 2009. With the coming of the freeware IES, two blending modes (Hue and Chroma) were added. Textures were improved to allow multiple layer-based textures. The TextArt G3 engine was enhanced with LINK metadata, and alpha shift was improved. IES 2.72 added the Luma Wand tool, fixed PNG and TIFF transparency issues, and fixed Smart-Paste transparency. IES 2.74 introduced alpha protection, and 2.75 followed with a new adjustments engine that faced out many effects implemented by the effects engine. The adjustments engine was designed to appeal to experienced image editors. IES 2.76 introduced a new transform engine and the Resizer for IES plug-in supporting multi-core and 18 scaling methods, including customizable windowed Sinc interpolation. IES 2.77 added Greyscale with Tint adjustment, separated the Lock and Click-Thru layer properties, extended the Cloning Brush with three options (this, below and composite) and also extended the Color Picker with multiple point sampling.

IES 3.01 brought a new look and many breakthrough tools to the suite. It was geared toward touch and was fully compatible with Windows 7. The toolbox was reorganized, with some tools being grouped and new ones added. Some message boxes were replaced with a new popup system, and the working of the workspace was changed to use a back-blitter, which enabled the addition of new blending modes, Screen and Mask. The printing interface was modified and given accurate proofing. Alpha Function Adjustment was added and a new Anti-Quantization Engine included for all adjustments to remove the need for 16 bits per channel editing. An internal clipboard was created to cater for copying images that are too large for the Windows clipboard, and translucency full-page gradients added. Some new tutorials were added and keyboard shortcuts made configurable.

IES 3.05 brought the power of custom full-page gradients to the suite, supporting .ggr, .grd and .gra gradients. New gradient styles were included, as was support for Adobe color tables (.act), palette previewing, point color editing and a highly improved TextArt engine.

Digital lightroom

IES 3.11 was introduced on 14 December 2009. It was done on a new development base and added a new application, raw-Input. This was a RAW image format processor based on dcraw. This application allowed the use of Chasys Draw IES in processing digital negatives, which are popular with professional photographers.

Chasys Draw IES 3.24 was released with a re-designed user interface, powered by a higher performance graphics core and better memory management. A history palette was introduced, as was a new screen capture function with video capability. The layer palette received drag-drop capability and unsharp masking got yet another upgrade. Soft proofing with ICC profiles was introduced in version 3.27. Full support for Win-7 was added in version, as was support for Exif. Support for graphics tablets (including Wacom) followed in version 3.33, and support for LightScribe Direct Disc Labeling was added in version 3.40.

Conversion to Unicode

Chasys Draw IES 3.56 was the product of porting Chasys Draw IES from ANSI to UNICODE. It featured the first version of the Live Language Translation Engine, with multiple language support. A new, Unicode-aware "TextArt G4" engine was also introduced. IES 3.63 featured highly improved Photoshop 8BF support, a Silent Install option, Drag-drop to the Layers window, a censoring brush (under fx Brush), Improved RAW support, FastExternals 2.22 with a new callback suite (pi_StateStore), an external histogram window and a new Touch Gadget. It also included several bug fixes. Fault-tolerant file saving and taskbar progress reporting for Windows 7 were introduced in version 3.64.

Recent versions

Recent versions of Chasys Draw IES have added high-end features such as adjustment layers, Power Management, jitter-corrected Video Screen Capture, video cropping, digitizer pen rotation (e.g. Wacom Intuos with 6D Art Pen), and Shell-out.

== Design ==
According to the author, Chasys Draw IES is designed under the mantra of Unique, flexible and powerful, and takes a radically different approach to image editing with the aim of opening up new possibilities for those who dare to dream.

=== Layers ===
Chasys Draw IES uses the concept of a free-style layer. A free-style layer is one that can be positioned anywhere, including totally removing it from the image and keeping it aside. Chasys Draw IES Artist provides free-style layering as a way to enable people to work with images the same way they would if the images were photos placed on their desk - you may stack what you need together, while placing pieces that you are not currently using outside the stack but within reach.

==== Adjustment Layers ====
Chasys Draw IES supports adjustment layers, with support for multiple adjustments per adjustment layer and the ability to import adjustment layers from Adobe Photoshop. Adjustment layers are special layers that adjust the information on the layers below them; they allow you to perform non-destructive image editing by applying adjustments to your image without permanently changing pixel values.

=== Image modes ===
The rendering (drawing) of layers in Chasys Draw IES Artist is dictated by a parameter called the image mode.

The default image mode, composite, renders the layers as a stack for the purpose of compositing. Two sub-modes are provided, a normal sub-mode that emphasizes free-style layering and a clipped sub-mode that clips the output like other image editing software.

In the multi-resolution image mode, similar copies of the image are made at different resolutions. The destination device then has a choice of images to choose from, depending on the intended display resolution. This mode is primarily used for creating icons and cursors.

The animation image mode is used for short videos, known as animations. In this mode, only one layer is displayed at a time, one after the other, after a duration of time dictated by the frame delay layer attribute. It is analogous to the way an artist can draw a slightly different figure on each page of a pad of paper so that when you flip between sheets rapidly, the drawing appears to move. This mode includes a sub-mode for onion-skin animation.

=== Layer attachments (metadata) ===
Chasys Draw IES can add descriptive information, such as the name and style of font used, path data, etc. to a layer. This information is called metadata, and is saved along with the layer. If the layer were to be opened for editing later, this information will be restored to facilitate easier editing.

=== File formats ===
Chasys Draw IES supports saving and loading a large number of different file formats, and support for others can be added using plug-ins. The software ships with plug-ins for over 100 different file formats, including PSD (native format for Adobe Photoshop, read and write), XCF (native format for GIMP, read and write), PDN (native format for Paint.NET, read only), CPT (native format for Corel Photo-Paint, read only), KRA (native format for Krita, read only), AFPHOTO (native format for Affinity Photo, read only), MDP (native format for Fire Alpaca), PXZ (native format for Pixlr), AWD (native format for ArtWeaver), ORA (OpenRaster interchange format) and several RAW image formats. It also supports FITS, which is the most commonly used digital file format in astronomy. The native format is Chasys Draw Image (CD5).

== Latest Changes ==
- Hyperlinks and HTML Image Maps via Mark-up tool
- Support for hyperlinks in Viewer and in preview in Artist
- File association grouping for easier management
- Improved Undo engine performance and efficiency
- Optimized rendering of adjustment layers (up to 50% faster)
- Performance throttling based on memory load in Converter
- Improved PDF file support (codec support, reliability)
- Improved PSD file support (better memory handling on save)

== Reviews ==
Reviews of Chasys Draw IES have been largely positive, with the editors at CNET download.com giving it a 5/5 star rating and saying "Chasys Draw IES Artist is a free, full-featured image editing and drawing program that does what big-box programs like Adobe Photoshop can do, with a few unique touches that set it apart and actually make it easier to use than the competition."

== Criticism ==
Chasys Draw IES has been criticized for its steep learning curve and the lack of a native CMYK mode. The lack of CMYK has been partly resolved by the addition of CMYK soft-proofing.
