= RightScale =

American software company

RightScale, Inc.
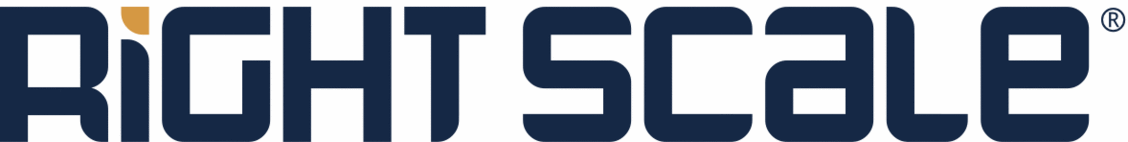
- Industry: Software as a service
- Founded: 2006
- Founder: Thorsten von Eicken; Michael Crandell; Rafael H. Saavedra
- Headquarters: Santa Barbara, California
- Key people: Michael Crandell, CEO; Raphael Simon, CTO; Steve Morrison, CFO; Josh Fraser, SVP Sales & Business Development; Kim Weins, VP Marketing and Cloud Cost Strategy; Bailey Caldwell, VP Customer Success; Ryan Williamson, VP Engineering; Ryan O'Leary, VP Product
- Products: RightScale Cloud Management Platform (CMP), RightScale Optima
- Website: www.rightscale.com

RightScale was a company that sold software as a service for cloud computing management for multiple providers. The company was based in Santa Barbara, California. It was acquired by Flexera Software in 2018.

== History ==
Thorsten von Eicken, a former professor of computer science at Cornell University, left to manage systems architecture for Expertcity, the startup company that became Citrix Online. He was joined by RightScale CEO Michael Crandell, and RightScale Vice President of Engineering Rafael H. Saavedra.

RightScale received $4.5 million in venture capital in April 2008, $13 million in December 2008, and $25 million in September 2010 at a valuation of $100-$125 million.

On November 5, 2012, RightScale announced it was expanding its existing relationship with cloud hosting provider Rackspace to integrate with OpenStack.

On July 18, 2012, RightScale announced its acquisition of the Scotland-based PlanForCloud.com (formerly ShopForCloud.com), which provides a free cloud cost forecasting service.

In February 2013, RightScale became the first cloud management company to resell Google Compute Engine public cloud services.

RightScale introduced the Cloud Maturity Model with the release of its second annual State of the Cloud Report on April 25, 2013. The report findings are based on a RightScale survey of 625 IT decision makers and categorized according to the Cloud Maturity Model, which is an analysis and segmentation of companies based on their varying degrees of cloud adoption.

On September 26, 2018, Flexera Software acquired RightScale for an undisclosed amount.

== Notes ==
- Fitzgerald, Michael. "Technology: When the Forecast Calls for Clouds — Is cloud computing right for your company?". www.inc.com.
- Wainewright, Phil. "RightScale makes EC2 a better fit for SaaS". ZDNet. Archived from the original on December 13, 2007.
- Howlett, Dennis. "RightScale cloud management extends to MySQL". ZDNet | Enterprise Alley. Archived from the original on June 26, 2008.
- Cogswell, Jeff (21 October 2008). "Page 2 - RightScale Eases Developing on Amazon EC2". www.eweek.com.
- Babcock, Charles. "RightScale Launches App Store For Infrastructure". www.informationweek.com.
- Babcock, Charles. "9 More Cloud Computing Pioneers". www.informationweek.com.
- Darrow, Barb. "Exclusive: RightScale Is First to Resell, Support Google Compute Engine". www.gigaom.com. Archived from the original on February 27, 2013.
- Butler, Brandon. "RightScale joins OpenStack, supports Rackspace's open cloud". www.networkworld.com.
- Verge, Jason. "RightScale, Rackspace Expand Cloud Partnership". www.datacenterknowledge.com.
- Talbot, Chris. "RightScale to Support Windows Azure Infrastructure Services". www.talkincloud.com.
