= KeepSolid VPN Unlimited =

Virtual private network provider

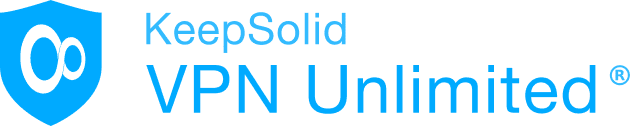
- Developer: KeepSolid Inc.
- Release: 2013; 13 years ago
- Operating system: Android; iOS; Linux; macOS; Windows
- Platform: Personal computer; smartphone; smart TV
- Type: Virtual private network
- License: Commercial proprietary software
- Website: www.vpnunlimited.com

KeepSolid VPN Unlimited is a personal virtual private network software available for iOS, macOS, Android, Windows, and Linux.

VPN Unlimited is developed by KeepSolid Inc, an American company with headquarters in New York City.

== History ==
KeepSolid VPN Unlimited was initially launched in 2013 on iOS and later expanded to other platforms.

In May 2016, VPN Unlimited received the Editor's Choice Award by PCMag.

In November 2018, VPN Unlimited released a lite version of freemium apps for Android and iOS.

In 2019, VPN Unlimited added an open-source WireGuard protocol to the list of available VPN protocols, in addition to IKEv2 and OpenVPN.

KeepSolid stopped providing torrent and P2P access for legacy lifetime subscribers on August 2026, when they rolled out an app update requiring an upgrade fee to regain P2P features. This took away crucial functionality like torrent servers access and placed them behind a paywall, even for users who already bought the service and paid for the lifetime subscription.

== Technology ==
VPN Unlimited has desktop applications for Windows, macOS, and Linux, and mobile apps for iOS and Android. The app is also available as an extension for Mozilla Firefox, Opera, Edge, and Google Chrome browsers.

VPN Unlimited supports protocols such as IKEv2,OpenVPN, and a proprietary protocol called KeepSolid Wise.

The technology routes the VPN traffic via TCP 443 ports, which makes the traffic harder to detect and block.

=== Additional features ===
Besides general-use VPN servers, the provider offers servers for specific purposes, including personal VPN servers, P2P sharing, and torrenting. Some additional features include, kill switch which disconnects the connection in case of any failure and privacy feature like no-log policy.

VPN Unlimited offers four subscription plans: monthly, yearly, tri-yearly, and lifetime.

== Servers ==
KeepSolid VPN Unlimited maintains over 3000 servers in more than 80 locations in different countries, including Australia, Austria, Belgium, Bulgaria, Brazil, Canada, Cyprus, Denmark, Finland, France, Germany, Hong Kong, Iceland, Ireland, Isle of Man, Israel, Italy, Japan, Mexico, the Netherlands, Romania, Singapore, South Africa, Sweden, Switzerland, Turkey, the United Kingdom, and the United States.

VPN Unlimited provides servers for streaming and torrents, but these servers, as of August 2026, require monthly payment, even for lifetime subscribers.

== Reception ==
A 2019 PCMag review of the Linux client concluded that the service was “a great choice for those unfamiliar with Linux… with enough speed for most applications”, echoing the earlier 2016 PCMag Editors’ Choice award. Macworld judged the service in 2019 to be "a nice-looking VPN with serviceable speeds". In its 2019 write-up, Tom's Guide praised VPN Unlimited's "impressive speeds" and "affordable plans with a lifetime subscription."

In a 2021 review, TechRadar wrote that VPN Unlimited delivers “excellent performance for a fair price”, but it still has “relatively few servers”. In October 2021, PCWorld called the Windows client “a useful app with minimal options”.

In September of 2026, Keepsolid removed features from the original lifetime subscription, such as using torrent/streaming servers. This was met with severe backlash from the users who have purchased the lifetime subscription. Reddit users on r/Keepsolid accused Keepsolid of "rugging" and scamming. Following this, the company's ratings on review platforms like TrustPilot, fell drastically.
