= WinPT =

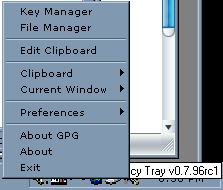
- WinPT in Windows XP
- Developer: Timo Schulz
- Release: 15 November 2005; 21 years ago
- Stable release: 1.4.3 (October 31, 2009; 17 years ago) [±]
- Preview release: 1.5.3 beta (June 2, 2012; 14 years ago) [±]
- Operating system: Microsoft Windows
- Available in: 3 languages
- Type: frontend
- License: GNU General Public License
- Website: winpt.wald.intevation.org

WinPT or Windows Privacy Tray is frontend to the GNU Privacy Guard (GnuPG) for the Windows platform. Released under GPL, it is compatible with OpenPGP compliant software.

WinPT represents a collection of user interface tools designed to ease the use of asymmetric encryption software. Based on GnuPG, and OpenPGP-compatible, WinPT is intended for Windows users to use for everyday message signing, verification, encryption and general key management.

If installation defaults are used, WinPT will then reside in the task bar tray, and on the right-click menu within Windows Explorer. A Start menu item includes launchers for a GPG commandline (console), WinPT tray, and documentation.

As of January 15, 2013, latest version (1.5.3 Beta) is only compatible with GnuPG 1.4.x and not with the most recent version 2.0.x.

WinPT is included in the GnuPT installer (that includes the latest version of GnuPG 1.4.x, WinPT 1.4.3 stable and WinPT latest beta.)

== History ==
On April 4, 2007, the project's author, Timo Schulz, announced that development on WinPT has been suspended for an indefinite period.

However, on October 27, 2008, Schulz announced a new version 1.30, described as a bug fix release.

On December 14, 2009, Timo Schulz announced that WinPT is discontinued due to lack of resources.

On January 19, 2012, Timo Schulz announced work on a new release and asked the community to contact him in regards to further development past future revision 1.5 if they are interested.

On October 21, 2012, Timo Schulz announced that the project had a new dedicated website.

The GnuPG Wiki currently (as of 2026) recommends using Kleopatra (software), included in the Gpg4win software suite, instead of WinPT.

== See also ==
- GNU Privacy Guard
- Gpg4win
- PGP
- Public-key cryptography
- Cryptography
