= UT-VPN =

Virtual private network at University of Tsukuba

- Original author(s): Daiyuu Nobori, SoftEther Corporation, University of Tsukuba
- Developer(s): Daiyuu Nobori, SoftEther Corporation, University of Tsukuba
- Initial release: 1.0.1 / June 28, 2010; 14 years ago
- Operating system: All UNIX Operating systems and Windows(UT-VPN Server), Windows and Linux(UT-VPN Client)
- Platform: Cross-platform
- Available in: Japanese
- Type: VPN
- License: GNU General Public License, version 2
- Website: http://utvpn.tsukuba.ac.jp/

University of Tsukuba Virtual Private Network, UT-VPN is a free and open source software application that implements virtual private network (VPN) techniques for creating secure point-to-point or site-to-site connections in routed or bridged configurations and remote access facilities. It uses SSL/TLS security for encryption and is capable of traversing network address translators (NATs) and firewalls. It was written by Daiyuu Nobori and SoftEther Corporation, and is published under the GNU General Public License (GPL) by University of Tsukuba.

UT-VPN has compatible as PacketiX VPN product of SoftEther Corporation. UT-VPN developed based on PacketiX VPN, but some functions was deleted. For example, the RADIUS client is supported by PacketiX VPN Server, but it is not supported by UT-VPN Server.

== Architecture ==
=== Encryption ===
UT-VPN uses the OpenSSL library to provide encryption to packets.

=== Authentication ===
UT-VPN offers username/password-based authentication.

=== Networking ===
UT-VPN is software to consist of UT-VPN Server and UT-VPN Client. UT-VPN functions as L2-VPN (over SSL/TLS).

==== UT-VPN Client ====
'Virtual NIC' (virtual network interface card) is installed in OS how UT-VPN Client was installed in. Virtual NIC is recognized as physical NIC by OS. UT-VPN does encapsulation to TCP (or SSL/TLS) packets from L2 frames by Virtual NIC.

UT-VPN Client connects with UT-VPN Server. If authorization with UT-VPN Server succeeded, UT-VPN Client establishes connection with Virtual HUB.

==== UT-VPN Server ====
UT-VPN Server have some 'Virtual HUB', and they function as virtual L2 switch. Virtual HUB does handle frames which received from UT-VPN Client. If necessary, UT-VPN Server forwards encapsulated L2 frames to UT-VPN Client. Virtual HUB on UT-VPN Server has function cascading connection for Virtual HUB on other UT-VPN Server. Site-to-site connection can come true with cascading connection.

===== L2 Bridge =====
UT-VPN Server has bridging function between arbitrary NIC which OS has and virtual HUB.

===== L3 Switch =====
UT-VPN Server has Virtual L3 switch function. Virtual L3 switch does L3-switching between virtual HUB on the UT-VPN Server.

== Operational Environment ==
=== UT-VPN Server ===
- Windows

- Windows 98 / Millennium Edition
- Windows NT 4.0
- Windows 2000
- Windows XP
- Windows Server 2003
- Windows Vista
- Windows Server 2008
- Hyper-V Server
- Windows 7
- Windows Server 2008 R2

* Supported for x86/x64

- UNIX

- Linux (2.4 or later)
- FreeBSD (6.0 or later)
- Solaris (8.0 or later)
- Mac OS X (Tiger or later)

* If it is the environment where compiling it is possible of the source code, UT-VPN Server works.

=== UT-VPN Client ===
- Windows

- Windows 98
- Windows ME
- Windows 2000
- Windows XP
- Windows Server 2003
- Windows Vista
- Windows Server 2008
- Hyper-V Server
- Windows 7
- Windows Server 2008 R2

*Supported for x86/x64

- UNIX

- Linux (2.4 or later)

* The Virtual NIC does not work in other UNIX operating systems.

== Community ==
The primary method for community support is through the SoftEther mailing lists.

== See also ==
- University of Tsukuba
- SoftEther Corporation
- OpenVPN, The well-known open source VPN software.
