= L3cos =

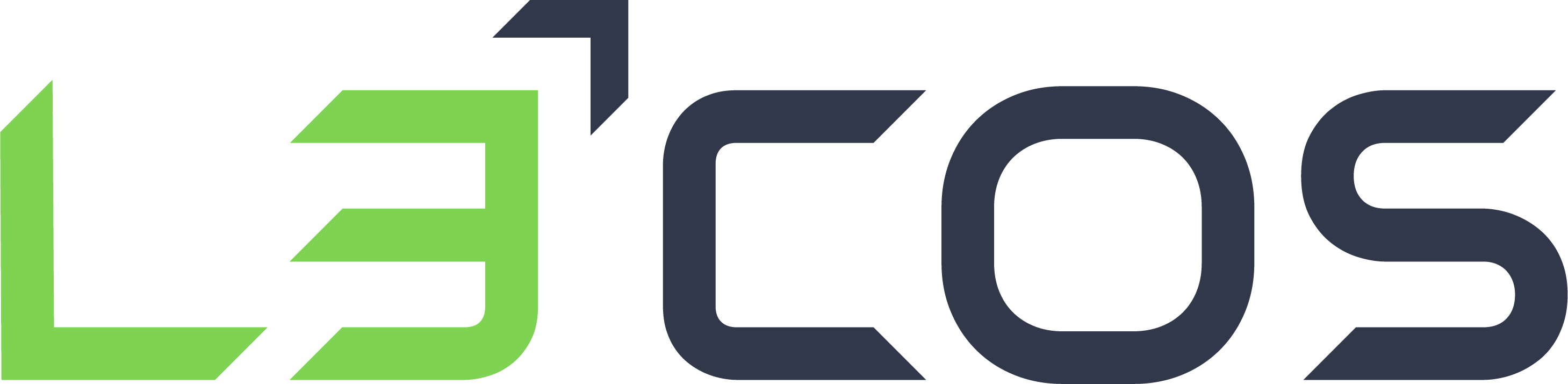
- Original author: Zurab Ashvil
- Release: 15 July 2013; 13 years ago
- Stable release: 1.10.6 / 8 January 2020; 6 years ago
- Preview release: 1.11.1 / 4 May 2021; 5 years ago
- Written in: C++, GO, JavaScript, node.js, Axios, Solidity
- Operating system: Linux, MacOS, Windows
- Standard: Infrastructure
- License: MIT
- Website: l3cos.com

L3COS (Level 3 Consensus Operating System) is an algorithm for digitising processes based on Blockchain, which has a three-level structure and is distributed as Platform as a Service for state bodies and businesses. The algorithm is based on the blockchain, in which any decision made at any of the levels will become part of the common chain. The technology involves a three-level framework that provides national governments, businesses, and private individuals with the tools to create a digital economy that does not allow fraudulent activity, financial or otherwise.

== History ==
Work on the “three-in-one” algorithm was started in 2013 and completed in October 2019. Founder and CEO of the project is Zurab Ashvil, a PHD in Cybernetics and Applied Mathematics, who was previously an executive of the Softbank Capital. The official launch of the algorithm was held at the World Economic Forum in Davos from 21 to 24 January 2020. Over the first eight years, more than $65 million was invested in the company.

In March 2020, the Central Bank of England invited private companies to participate in the development of a CBDC (Central Bank Digital Currency). In June 2020, a proposal was made to the Central Bank of England to use L3COS technology.

In March 2021, information emerged that the world’s first digital platform for agricultural goods and foodstuffs, AgriDex, was investing $85 million to develop it's platform on L3COS blockchain. The creation of a smart marketplace allows improvements in global food security, with reduced transaction costs and reduced food costs to consumers. The plan was to create a tokenised payment and exchange platform for AgriDex based on blockchain. The volume of supplies was estimated at $2.25 trillion annually. The technology will enable the company to process more than 1.5 million concurrent transactions per second and provide more than 150 companies with access to the marketplace.

In April 2021, L3COS announced a new partnership with US label ENT Global Technologies and entertainment company TITLE 9 Inc. The $110 million deal will enable L3COS to create a global digital rights management system and a trading platform for music and film.

In September 2022 Eros Investments, a portfolio of entertainment and tech companies like Eros Media World, Eros Now, and Xfinite's Mzaalo, has picked up a 90% stake in digital rights management company ENT Global for an undisclosed sum, and partnered with blockchain-based operating system L3COS.

== L3RS-1 open standard ==
In February 2026, an open technical standard derived from L3COS was published under the name L3RS-1 (Layer-3 Regulated Asset Standard). The specification was deposited in the Zenodo open-research repository on 24 February 2026 by Ashvil, who is listed with affiliations to T3RRA Ltd, L3COS Ltd, and the L3RS Foundation. The deposit is classified by Zenodo as resource type "Standard" and is indexed in OpenAIRE. The specification is published under a Creative Commons Attribution 4.0 International licence.

The standard, as described in the deposited specification, "binds asset state, compliance logic, governance configuration, and jurisdictional anchoring into a cryptographically verifiable certificate identifier" and "establishes formal invariants, canonical serialization rules, and a defined adversarial model to ensure downgrade resistance and cross-chain integrity."

A reference implementation SDK was released as version 1.0.0 on 16 March 2026 under the Apache License 2.0, with implementations in six programming languages (TypeScript, Python, Go, Rust, Java, and Solidity). The reference implementation enforces the eleven protocol invariants defined by the standard and is accompanied by ninety-two canonical conformance test vectors required to be reproduced identically across all conformant implementations.

L3RS-1 is governed by the L3RS Foundation under the amendment process defined in the specification, and is published as royalty-free.

== Principle of operation ==
More than 1200 programmers worked on the development of PaaS (Platform as a Service). This platform enables governments, organisations, businesses, and individuals to create and run applications on its operating system.

The technology at the state level allows smart contracts and business applications to be developed without the involvement of an algorithm developer. The technology works on the basis of separate consensus algorithms, which allows users to access highly effective functionality and automate their processes while retaining the capabilities of discrete digital identification and creating a basis for managing them.

The L3COS algorithm consists of three levels: The top level operates on the basis of the Proof of Government (PoGvt) algorithm and is designed for national governments, providing them with their own ‘Supernode’ which allows them to regulate the citizens’ financial history.

The middle level of the technology is targeted at commercial enterprises and organisations.

The lower level is based on the Proof of Storage (PoST) consensus algorithm and provides individuals with the opportunity to lease their storage to other blockchain participants, thereby providing control over the use of personal data.

== Founder ==
Zurab Ashvil holds a PhD in Cybernetics and Applied Mathematics from Tbilisi State University. Before founding L3COS, he held an executive position at SoftBank Capital. His ORCID is 0009-0000-9848-7256.

== See also ==
- Central bank digital currency
- Blockchain
- Tokenization
- Real-world asset
