= Corel Photo-Paint =

Raster graphics editing software

- Corel Photo-Paint X5 under Windows 7
- Developer(s): Alludo
- Initial release: 1992; 33 years ago
- Stable release: Photo-Paint 2024.2.1
- Written in: C++
- Operating system: Windows
- Type: Raster graphics editor
- License: Proprietary
- Website: www.coreldraw.com

Corel Photo-Paint is a raster graphics editor developed and marketed by Corel since 1992. Corel markets the software for Windows and Mac OS operating systems, previously having marketed versions for Linux (Version 9, requiring Wine). Its primary market competitor is Adobe Photoshop.

In 2006, Corel released version 13 as Photo-Paint X3, employing this naming convention for subsequent releases as well as for CorelDraw, included with Photo-Paint in CorelDraw Graphics Suite. The current version is Photo-Paint 2020. Corel has marketed a limited edition of Photo-Paint called Corel Photo-Paint SELECT with HP scanning hardware, e.g., the HP ScanJet 5p scanners.

== Features ==
Photo-Paint's native format is .CPT (Corel Photo-Paint Image), which stores image data as well as information within an image, including objects (layers in some raster editors), colour profiles, text, transparency, effect filters.

The program can open and convert vector formats from CorelDraw and Adobe Illustrator and can open other formats, including PNG, JPG and GIF files — as well as competing photo editor formats from Photoshop, GIMP and Paint Shop Pro (the latter also a Corel product). The program also supports plug-in functionality including those developed for Adobe Photoshop and Paint Shop Pro. Other extensions such as brushes are also compatible with Photo-Paint.

Corel Photo-Paint X6–X7 supports OpenType font features. With X7 Update 4 the Font List new additional features in X7 Update 4 allows for filtering type fonts by weight, width, supported scripts, font Technology, Character Range, Style.

As other raster graphics editors, Corel Photo-Paint allows an image to be edited in multiple layers, called objects here. A gradient line going from opaque to transparent, for instance, can be used to have a darker foreground color fade into a lighter background color. The UI is highly customizable, and the user can freely move dialogs or adjust button sizes and such. Effects can be applied to a picture including Smart Blur—a type of Gaussian blur effect which however retains sharpness around sharper edges—Mesh Warp, Camera Lens Flare, Trace Contour and others. There is limited support for vector paths to be integrated. Depending on personal preferences and work style, users may prefer Corel Photo-Paint over Adobe Photoshop or the other way round, though in terms of market share, Photoshop is clearly more represented.

As a component of the CorelDraw Graphics Suite, Photo-Paint can exchange data with other programs in the suite, including Corel Connect (Version X5 - X7), which enables users to share files between different computer software and drives on the user's computer. CorelDraw and Photo-Paint are also copy-paste compatible, with format and effects retention — and without file conversion.

Just like in CorelDraw, Photo Paint tasks can be automatized by scripts and macros, using both COREL Script and Microsoft's VBA (Visual Basic for Applications) and VSTA (Visual Studio Tools for Applications). Corel calls the smaller macros created with COREL Script "Scripts", and the scripts created with the Microsoft tools "macros".

== See also ==
- Image editing
- Raster graphics
- Digital darkroom
- Graphics file format summary
- Photo manipulation
- Comparison of raster graphics editors
