= OpenSC =

Tools for working with smart cards

- Developer: OpenSC Project
- Repository: github.com/OpenSC/OpenSC
- Written in: C
- Operating system: Linux, macOS, Windows
- Type: Security library
- License: LGPLv2.1
- Website: github.com/OpenSC/OpenSC/wiki

OpenSC is a set of software tools and libraries to work with smart cards, with the focus on smart cards with cryptographic capabilities. OpenSC facilitate the use of smart cards in security applications such as authentication, encryption and digital signatures. OpenSC implements the PKCS #15 standard and the PKCS #11 API. For its reader backend OpenSC can use either CT-API or PC/SC.

It also provides some support for Common Data Security Architecture (CDSA) on macOS and Microsoft CryptoAPI on Windows, but it is still work in progress.
