= Atlas VPN =

Virtual private network provider

- Developer: Peakstar Technologies Inc.
- Operating system: Windows, macOS, Android, iOS, Linux
- Platform: Personal Computer, Smartphone, Smart TV
- Type: Virtual private network
- License: Proprietary
- Website: https://atlasvpn.com

Atlas VPN was a freemium VPN service provider, launched in 2019 with applications for Microsoft Windows, macOS, Linux, Android, iOS, Android TV, Apple TV, and Amazon Fire TV. It was discontinued in April 2024 and merged with NordVPN.

Atlas VPN also offered a data breach monitoring feature that notified users of potential data breaches.

== History ==
Atlas VPN was operated by Peakstar Technologies Inc.

In March 2020, Atlas VPN gave away a three-month subscription to its premium VPN services to combat misinformation about coronavirus. According to research conducted by the firm, internet censorship is leaving the citizens of some countries uninformed or misinformed about the extent of the outbreak.

On October 15, 2021, Nord Security announced that it had reached a deal to acquire Atlas VPN. However, Atlas VPN continues acting independently and pursuing its goals in the "freemium" VPN services market. In February 2022, Atlas VPN distributed one-year premium VPN subscriptions to media personnel in Ukraine at no cost as a gesture of support.

As of August 2023, Atlas VPN had 1000+ servers in 49 locations across the world. On March 25, 2024, it was announced that Atlas VPN would shut down on April 24. Existing customers would be transferred to NordVPN.

== Reviews ==
Forbes rated Atlas VPN 4.4 out of 5, while The Independent, Chip.de and Tom' s Hardware praised its speed. TechRepublic, in turn, reviewed it as a budget-friendly VPN service. German Computer Bild magazine and American Money magazine in their extensive reviews, featured the speed and security as pros, while citing a low number of US servers as a con. PCMag praised its freemium options, but criticized the app's awkward interface.

== Technology ==
Atlas VPN offers two different connection protocols: IPSec/IKEv2 and WireGuard tunneling protocols. It used ChaCha20 or AES-256 for data encryption.

In 2020, Atlas VPN launched the VPN Adoption Index, a research analyzing VPN download and usage across the world.

According to ZDNET, in February 2023, Atlas VPN started upgrading its service with 10 Gbit/s servers, allowing it to accommodate a larger number of users without experiencing congestion.
