= Gérald Bronner =

French social scientist and author

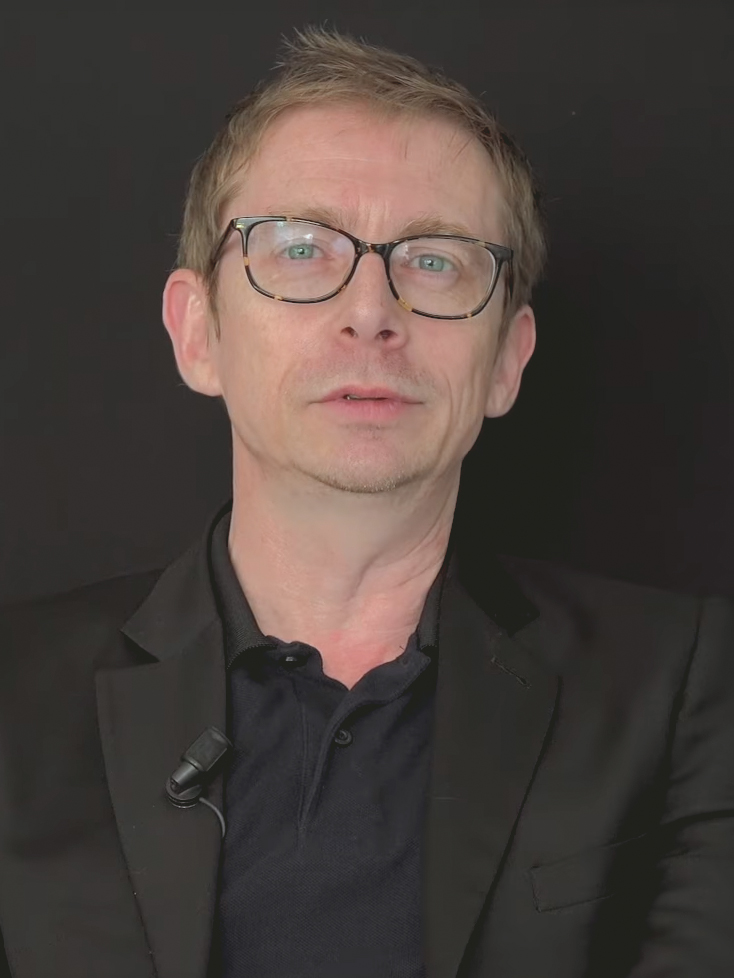
- Gerald Bronner (2018)
- Born: May 22, 1969 (age 57)

Gérald Bronner (born 22 May 1969) is a French social scientist and author. Bronner is a professor of sociology at Sorbonne University and is a member of the Institut Universitaire de France (University Institute of France). He is one of the main proponents of cognitive sociology in France and is known for his work on collective beliefs as well as for his involvement in jihadist radicalization prevention programs with the French government. More generally, his research has focused on the key success factors of a belief in social contexts.

== Career ==
After finishing his dissertation (‘The sociological implications of aversion to uncertainty’), Gerald Bronner became a lecturer at Université de Nancy in 1998. He was head of the sociology department there from 1999 to 2001.

In 2000, at a conference of the Association Internationale des Sociologues de Langue Française (International Association of Francophone Social Scientists, AISLF), he met Jean-Michel Berthelot with whom he started a multi-year collaboration. Bronner and Berthelot co-headed an AISLF research committee, which gave way in 2008 to a research committee on ‘Logic, methodology, and knowledge theories’ headed by Bronner.

In 2003, he published L’Empire des croyances (PUF) which earned him the Académie des sciences morales et politiques prize. In 2004, he joined the Sorbonne, where he became co-head, again with Berthelot, of the Centre d’études sociologiques (Center for sociological studies). Around the same time, he was named to the editing committee of L’Année sociologique, and publishing house Editions Hermann asked him to establish their ‘Society and Thoughts’ collection. In 2006, he defended an HDR (post-doc dissertation) on the import of the cognitive bias concept in sociology, which was subsequently published as L’Empire de l’erreur.

In 2007, he was named professor at Université de Strasbourg. That year he joined the admission committee for the ‘agrégation de sciences économiques et sociales’ where he served as vice-president (2008–2010). In 2008, his nomination gave him the opportunity to do further research in the United States. He finished that year The Future of Collective Beliefs.

In 2010, he earned the European Amalfi Prize for Sociology and Social Sciences for his book La Pensée extrême : comment des hommes ordinaires deviennent des fanatiques that focuses on mental processes leading ordinary individuals toward radicalism and fanaticism.

In 2012, he began serving as a professor at the Université Paris-Diderot (Paris VII) where he co-heads the Laboratoire interdisciplinaire des énergies de Demain (Interdisciplinary laboratory for future energies) and teaches a course on ‘the cognitive sociology of energy’.

In 2013, he published La Démocratie des crédules, for which he received the Revue des deux Mondes prize. In the same year he received the Union rationaliste prize, and in January 2014, the Procope des Lumières prize.

He writes for mainstream publications (Cerveau & Psycho, Le Nouvel Observateur, Sciences Humaines, Le Point, Pour la Science) and often appears in the media.

Following the series of terror attacks in France in 2015 and 2016, and a rise in conspiracy theories around these events, he was invited to take part in the first ‘deradicalization center’ at Beaumont-en-Véron. He joined the Conseil Scientifique de Lutte contre la Radicalisation Violente created by the French Ministry of Justice and co-authored a report of the Mission Interministérielle de Vigilance et de Lutte contre les Dérives Sectaires ([Interministerial mission against cult like] - MIVILUDE) in 2015.

On 26 September 2017, he was elected member of the Académie Nationale de Médecine. On 13 February 2018, he gave a lecture entitled: Scientific results and opinion phenomena.

In January 2021, he published Apocalypse cognitive with PUF (bestseller and number one in the publisher's sales for 2021) - a book that questions the contemporary use of "available brain time" freed up by technological assistants. In October 2021, he received the Aujourd'hui prize for this book.

== Theoretical views ==
Bronner's work centers on collective beliefs and more generally social cognition phenomena. He is a proponent of cognitive sociology, which studies cognitive biases as applied to social variables (most notably culture). For instance, he published an article comparing counterarguments to Darwinian evolutionary theory in the US and France (Revue Française de Sociologie, 3, 2007) and how they differ depending on the cultural context.

He developed the notion of ‘cognitive market’, which he defined as a market ‘where cognitive products are traded such as assumptions, beliefs, knowledge, which can compete against one another, or exist in situations of monopoly or oligopoly.’

He published works on the epistemology of social science, including the use of the concept of rationality, and the interactions of social science with cognitive science and neuroscience.

== Research topics ==
His work covers a wide range of topics, including the mechanisms at play in entering a cult, how children stop believing in Father Christmas, risk perception and political and religious extremist thoughts. His aim is to understand and help formalize a theoretical framework on the formation of representations and beliefs.

He is one of the first, in the early 2000s, to have warned against the potential negative effects of information market deregulation via widespread use of Internet. He summarized these processes in La démocratie des crédules, where he demonstrates how hoaxes and fake news are able to rapidly spread and form the basis to layered arguments such as conspiracy theories.

In L’inquiétant principe de précaution he exposed the reasons he and his co-author E. Géhin call ‘precautionism’, i.e. the unconditional (and often ideologically driven) application of the precautionary principle.

In La planète des hommes - Réenchanter le risque, he analyzes the theories underpinning governmental and administrative action and argues that basing entire policies on ideas such as Hans Jonas’ responsibility principle can lead to unintended and sometimes potentially dangerous consequences.

== Publications and references ==
- “They” Respond: Comments on Basham et al.’s “Social Science’s Conspiracy-Theory Panic: Now They Want to Cure Everyone” (with Dieguez, Sebastian, Véronique Campion-Vincent, Sylvain Delouvée, Nicolas Gauvrit, Anthony Lantian & Pascal Wagner-Egger, Social Epistemology Review and Reply Collective
