= VPNLab =

Criminal VPN service

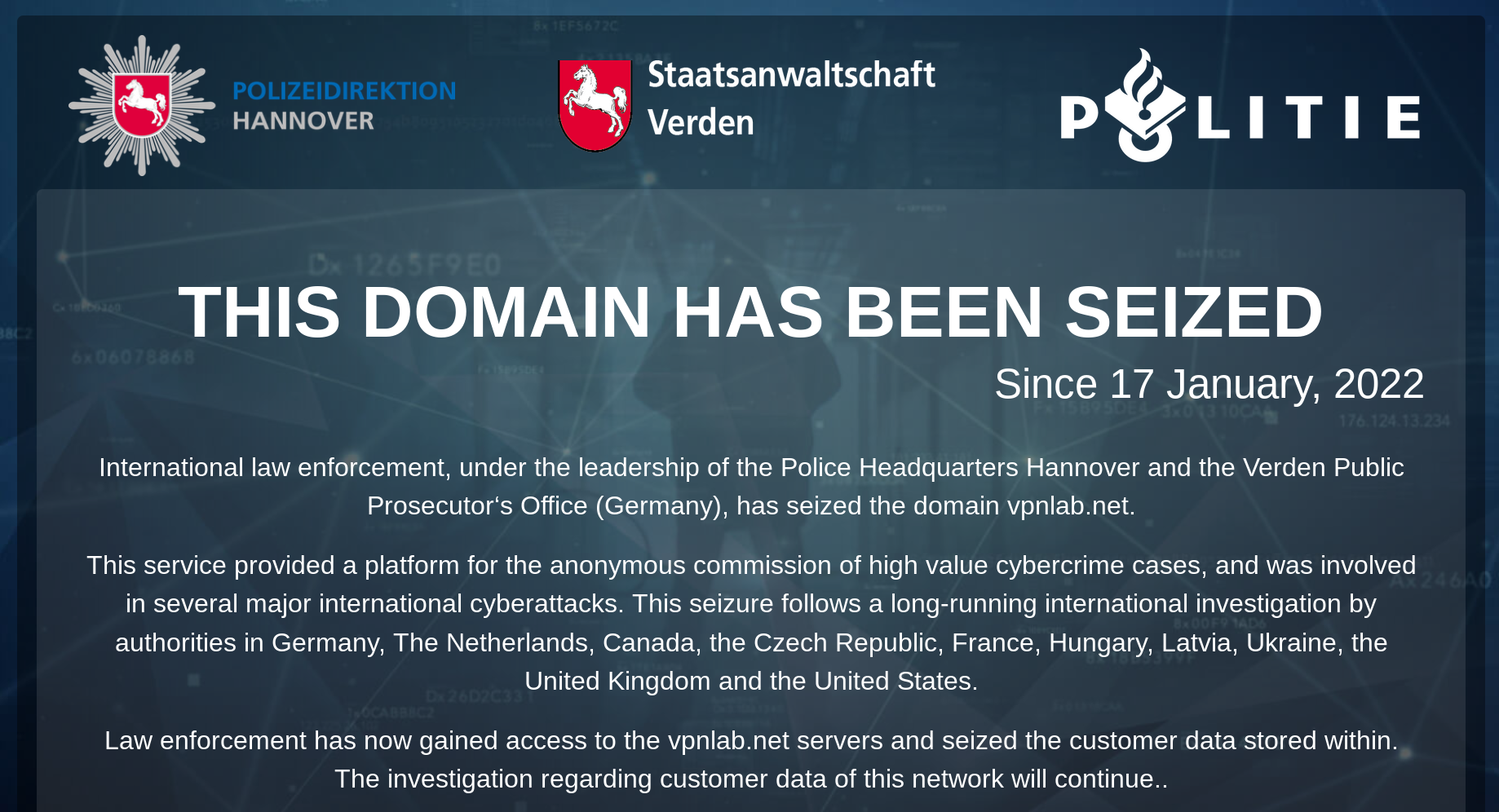
VPNLab.net website seized by law enforcement

VPNLab was a VPN service that catered to cyber criminals. The service was seized and shut down by Europol in January 2022.

== History ==
VPNLab was created in 2008. The service advertised VPN servers in multiple countries and offered multiple encryption. The service was known for providing services to cybercriminals, specifically ransomware authors. The site accepted a variety of payment methods, including WebMoney and Bitcoin. The "DoubleVPN" service was offered for $129 per year. The owners advertised the website on the dark web.

== Raid and shutdown ==
On January 17, 2022, Europol, along with other national law enforcement agencies seized VPNLab's domain. As of January 19, 2022, no arrests were made. Along with Europol, the FBI (United States), Central Directorate of the Judicial Police (France), and National Crime Agency (United Kingdom) were involved in the site raid.
