= OpenXPKI =

Open source public key infrastructure software

- Developer(s): The OpenXPKI Foundation
- Written in: Perl
- Operating system: Unix-like operating systems
- Type: Public key infrastructure
- License: Apache License V 2.0
- Website: http://www.openxpki.org/

The OpenXPKI project stewards an open-source Public Key Infrastructure (PKI) software.

== History ==
The OpenXPKI project commenced c. 2005 and began to produce usable software from c. 2010 but choose to take a precautionary approach with the first production level release in 2015. The approach taken was to create a modular system with most modules capable of being re-utilised in other systems - a Workflow engine centered approach.

The software has been mostly written in Perl and designed to run on Unix-like operating systems such as FreeBSD and Linux. Database backends have been created for MySQL, PostgreSQL, the Oracle Database and IBM Db2.

== Technical ==
After installation the software on the node is configured to act as a Certificate Authority (CA), Registration Authority (RA) or End-Entity Enrollment (EE) node.

One client implementation is a web frontend that allows end-users to access the OpenXPKI system using a web browser, and a command line interface also available for system administrators. OpenXKPI also has a SCEP interface available.

== Reception ==
OpenXPKI has been used successfully in scenarios from performance testing up to enterprise level environments. Shortcomings are that it requires additional components to complete a certificate based authentication, including software for efficient certificate distribution.
