= Ccrypt =

ccrypt is a utility for the secure encryption and decryption of files and streams. It was designed as a replacement for the standard UNIX crypt utility, which is notorious for using a very weak encryption algorithm.

ccrypt is based on the Rijndael cypher, the same cipher used in the AES standard. However, in the AES standard a 128-bit block size is used, whereas ccrypt uses a 256-bit block size. ccrypt commonly uses the .cpt file extension for encrypted files.

ccrypt does not provide an authenticated encryption scheme and therefore does not protect the integrity of encrypted data.

== See also ==
- bcrypt
- crypt (Unix)
- mcrypt
- scrypt
