= Mcrypt =

mcrypt is a replacement for the popular Unix crypt command. crypt was a file encryption tool that used an algorithm very close to the World War II Enigma cipher. Mcrypt provides the same functionality but uses several modern algorithms such as AES. Libmcrypt, Mcrypt's companion, is a library of code that contains the actual encryption functions and provides an easy method for use. The last update to libmcrypt was in 2007, despite years of unmerged patches. Maintained alternatives include ccrypt, libressl, and others.

Examples of mcrypt usage in a Linux command-line environment:

 mcrypt --list                           # See available encryption algorithms.           
 mcrypt -a blowfish myfilename           # Encrypts myfilename to myfilename.nc           
                                         # using the Blowfish encryption algorithm.       
                                         # You are prompted two times for a passphrase.   
 mcrypt -d mytextfile.txt.nc             # Decrypts mytextfile.txt.nc to mytextfile.txt.  
 mcrypt -V -d -a enigma -o scrypt --bare # Can en/decrypt files crypted with SunOS crypt. 
 mcrypt --help

It implements numerous cryptographic algorithms, mostly block ciphers and stream ciphers, some of which fall under export restrictions in the United States. Algorithms include DES, Blowfish, ARCFOUR, Enigma, GOST, LOKI97, RC2, Serpent, 3-Way, Twofish, WAKE, and XTEA.

== See also ==
- bcrypt
- crypt (Unix)
- ccrypt
- scrypt
