= Core FTP =

Freeware secure FTP client for Windows

Core FTP Client
- Developer: CoreFTP.com
- Stable release: 2.2 (Build 1960) / September 28, 2020
- Preview release: 2.3 (Build 1981) / May 25, 2023
- Written in: C++
- Operating system: Windows
- Type: FTP client
- License: Proprietary, Freeware
- Website: http://www.coreftp.com/

Core FTP LE is a freeware secure FTP client for Windows, developed by CoreFTP.com. Features include FTP, SSL/TLS, SFTP via SSH, and HTTP/HTTPS support. Secure FTP clients encrypt account information and data transferred across the internet, protecting data from being seen, or sniffed across networks. Core FTP is a traditional FTP client with local files displayed on the left, remote files on the right.

Core FTP Server is a secure FTP server for Windows, developed by CoreFTP.com, starting in 2010.

== Licensing ==
CoreFTP LE is free for personal, educational, non-profit, and business use.

== Reviews and references ==
- PC Magazine – 59 Ways to Supercharge Windows – Odds & Ends – Core FTP LE
- Softpedia.com – Reviews – "Today, try Core FTP Lite!" – By: Codrut Nistor, Editor, Software Reviews
