= Crypt (Unix) =

Obsolete encryption program

crypt
- Original author: Robert Morris
- Developer: AT&T Bell Laboratories
- Release: February 1973; 53 years ago
- Operating system: Unix, Unix-like, Inferno
- Type: Command

In Unix computing, crypt or enigma is a utility program used for encryption. Due to the ease of breaking it, it is considered to be obsolete.

The program is usually used as a filter, and it has traditionally been implemented using a "rotor machine" algorithm based on the Enigma machine. It is considered to be cryptographically far too weak to provide any security against brute-force attacks by modern, commodity personal computers.

Some versions of Unix shipped with an even weaker version of the crypt(1) command in order to comply with contemporaneous laws and regulations that limited the exportation of cryptographic software. Some of these were simply implementations of the Caesar cipher (effectively no more secure than ROT13, which is implemented as a Caesar cipher with a well-known key).

== History ==
Cryptographer Robert Morris wrote a M-209-based crypt, which first appeared in Version 3 Unix, to encourage codebreaking experiments; Morris managed to break crypt by hand. Dennis Ritchie automated decryption with a method by James Reeds, and a new Enigma-based version appeared in Version 7, which Reeds and Peter J. Weinberger also broke.

== crypt(1) under Linux ==
Linux distributions generally do not include a Unix compatible version of the crypt command. This is largely due to a combination of three major factors:

1. crypt is relatively obscure and rarely used for e-mail attachments nor as a file format
2. crypt is considered to be cryptographically far too weak to withstand brute-force attacks by modern computing systems (Linux systems generally ship with GNU Privacy Guard which is considered to be reasonably secure by modern standards)
3. During the early years of Linux development and adoption there was some concern that even as weak as the algorithm used by crypt was, that it might still run afoul of ITAR's export controls; so mainstream distribution developers in the United States generally excluded it, leaving their customers to fetch GnuPG or other strong cryptographic software from international sites, sometimes providing packages or scripts to automate that process.

The source code to several old versions of the crypt command is available in The Unix Heritage Society's Unix Archive. The recent crypt source code is available in the OpenSolaris project. A public domain version is available from the Crypt Breaker's Workbench.

Enhanced symmetric encryption utilities are available for Linux (and should also be portable to any other Unix-like system) including mcrypt and ccrypt. While these provide support for much more sophisticated and modern algorithms, they can be used to encrypt and decrypt files which are compatible with the traditional crypt(1) command by providing the correct command line options.

== Breaking crypt(1) encryption ==
Programs for breaking crypt(1) encryption are widely available. Bob Baldwin's public domain Crypt Breaker's Workbench, which was written in 1984-1985, is an interactive tool that provides successive plaintext guesses that must be corrected by the user. It also provides a working crypt(1) implementation used by modern BSD distributions.

Peter Selinger's unixcrypt-breaker uses a simple statistical model similar to a dictionary-attack that takes a set of plain texts as input and processes it to guess plausible plaintexts, and does not require user interaction.

== Relationship to password hash function ==
There is also a Unix password hash function with the same name, crypt. Though both are used for securing data in some sense, they are otherwise essentially unrelated. To distinguish between the two, writers often refer to the utility program as crypt(1), because it is documented in section 1 of the Unix manual pages, and refer to the password hash function as crypt(3), because its documentation is in section 3 of the manual.

== See also ==
- crypt – an unrelated Unix C library function
- Symmetric-key algorithm
- Enigma machine
