= GnoMint =

Software tool for managing X.509 certification authorities

gnoMint
- Developer: David Marín Carreño
- Stable release: 1.3.0 / March 15, 2016
- Operating system: Multi-platform
- Type: Security software
- License: GNU General Public License v3
- Website: gnomint.sf.net
- Repository: gnomint.git.sourceforge.net/gitroot/gnomint/gnomint

gnoMint is a free software tool for managing X.509 certification authorities (CAs).

Its purpose is to offer an easy-to-use interface for creating certification authorities and all related elements including X.509 digital certificates, certificate signing requests (CSRs) and certificate revocation lists (CRLs).

== Features ==
gnoMint has the following features:

- All the infrastructure needed to keep and run a certification authority is saved in only one file.
- It's able to create certificate signing requests, allowing to export them to PKCS#8 files, so they can be sent to other CAs.
- Allows the creation of X.509 certificates, with a usual set of subject-parameters.
- Can export certificates and private keys to PEM files, so they can be used by external applications. It also allows to export PKCS#12 structures, so the certificates can be imported easily by web and mail clients.
- The user can establish a set of policies for certificate generation in each one of the existing CAs.
- gnoMint can import CSRs made by other applications.
- The certificates can be revoked, with generation of the corresponding CRLs
- It allows the possibility of keeping the CA private key, or other private keys, in external files or devices (as USB drives)
- gnoMint is able to manage of a whole hierarchy of CAs, simultaneously, with their respectives certificates.
- Pre-existing Certification Authorities made by other applications, as OpenSSL or TinyCA, can be imported with all their data.
- It has a CLI intended for batch certificate creation, or integration with other utilities.

== Licence and motivation ==
gnoMint is licensed under the GNU General Public License.

gnoMint is intended to help all systems and network administrators to deploy a Certification Authority very easily. Its development was started due to the lack of a 'just-works' CA software. According to gnoMint's author, "creating a CA from zero, through open-source command-line utilities, was possible, but was uncomfortable to remember all the necessary parameters. And you had to create a difficult configuration file."

== See also ==
- Open Source implementations
