= VPNBook =

VPN service

VPNBook is a Web Proxy and VPN service offering servers in multiple countries.

== Description ==
The service connects to a VPN via OpenVPN, WireGuard or Outline VPN clients, or a PPTP connection. There are minimal variety of geographic locations. Available servers include the United States, Canada, Germany, France, Poland, and the UK. VPNBook can be used to bypass some governmental restrictions. The service can be connected to by two ways, by connection via a third-party OpenVPN client or through PPTP. The Mac OS X, iOS, Android, Ubuntu, and Windows operating systems all have PPTP support built in.

The software (OpenVPN clients) can also be used, which provides the protocol stack, file system, and process scheduling. OpenVPN uses SSL protocol which is generally more secure than Layer 2 Tunnel Protocol's PPTP.

== Reception ==
In a review done by PC Magazine, it was concluded that the service is a good choice among free VPN services, even though it has certain functionality flaws. TechRadar reviewed VPNBook negatively, criticizing its poor performance and lack of desktop and mobile apps.

== See also ==
- Comparison of virtual private network services
