= K virtual machine =

- Original author(s): Sun Microsystems
- Developer(s): Oracle Corporation
- Written in: C
- Type: Java virtual machine
- Website: www.oracle.com/technetwork/java/embedded/javame/java-mobile/kvmwp-150240.pdf

The K virtual machine (KVM) is a virtual machine developed by Sun Microsystems (now owned by Oracle Corporation), derived from the Java virtual machine (JVM) specification. The KVM was written from scratch in the programming language C. It is designed for small devices with 128K to 256K of available computer memory, and minimizes memory use. It supports a subset of the features of the higher end JVM. For example, a KVM may not support floating-point arithmetic and object finalization. The Connected Limited Device Configuration (CLDC) specifies use of the KVM. The 'K' in KVM stands for kilobyte, signifying that the KVM runs in kilobytes of memory in contrast to megabytes.

== See also ==
- Java virtual machine
