= Guardian Firewall =

Mobile application providing a virtual private network

- Developer: Sudo Security Group
- Initial release: June 2019; 6 years ago
- Operating system: iOS, macOS, Android, Windows, Fire OS
- Type: Virtual private network, Firewall, Privacy software
- License: Proprietary
- Website: guardianapp.com

Guardian Firewall is a privacy-focused application that combines virtual private network (VPN) and firewall functionality to block data and location trackers on mobile and desktop devices. Developed by Sudo Security Group and founded by security researcher Will Strafach, the application is available for iOS, macOS, Android, Windows, and Fire OS platforms.

== History ==
Guardian Firewall was founded in 2013 by Will Strafach, a security researcher and former iPhone jailbreaker known by the alias "Chronic." The company gained prominence in 2017 when Strafach discovered that the AccuWeather mobile application was transmitting precise user location data to third-party companies without user permission.

The Guardian Firewall application became publicly available in June 2019, initially launching for iOS devices. The application subsequently expanded to additional platforms including macOS, Android, Windows, and Fire OS.

In August 2022, Guardian was acquired by DNSFilter, a provider of DNS-based web content filtering and threat protection. Following the acquisition, Guardian continued to operate as a standalone application while integrating DNSFilter's AI-powered DNS security features.

== Functionality ==
Guardian Firewall operates by routing device traffic through an encrypted VPN tunnel to Guardian's servers, where the system identifies and blocks unauthorized tracking attempts. The application blocks connections to location trackers, email trackers, and data collection services while encrypting network traffic using AES-256 encryption.

The software supports both IKEv2 and WireGuard VPN protocols.

== Privacy ==
Guardian Firewall operates on a no-logs policy, stating that it does not collect or store user activity data, connection logs, or personally identifiable information. The service underwent independent security audits by security firm Assured in 2024 to verify its privacy practices and infrastructure configurations.

== Brave Browser Partnership ==
In July 2020, Guardian partnered with Brave Software to integrate Guardian's firewall and VPN technology into the Brave web browser. The integration, branded as Brave Firewall + VPN, provides system-wide protection beyond browser traffic and is available across Brave's iOS, Android, macOS, and Windows applications.

== See also ==
- Virtual private network
- Firewall (computing)
- Internet privacy
- Online tracking
- Brave browser
