= Teamwire =

Teamwire GmbH (former: grouptime GmbH)
- Company type: Private
- Industry: Information Technology
- Founded: 2010
- Headquarters: Munich, Germany
- Key people: Tobias Stepan
- Products: Teamwire
- Website: teamwire.eu

Teamwire is a technology start-up based in Munich, Germany, that was originally called grouptime GmbH. The company focuses on mobile messaging apps and secure communications for regulated industries. The core product is Teamwire, an encrypted instant messaging app for enterprises and the public sector.

== History ==
The company was founded in August 2010 in Munich (Germany) by Tobias Stepan. In September 2011 the grouptime app was officially launched for devices with Apple`s iOS.

In March 2014 grouptime launched a secure enterprise messaging app called Teamwire to simplify and focus on internal communication. The idea was to provide a messenger for businesses, to replace the email as the dominant channel for team communication. By mid of 2014 grouptime abandoned its consumer product and completely focused on the enterprise messaging market. In January 2015 in addition to the German cloud Teamwire became also available as an on-premise and private cloud deployment in order to fulfill the strong data protection requirements of enterprises, large corporations and the public sector. In March 2016 Teamwire became a cross-platform enterprise messaging app with the release of apps for desktop devices like Windows, Mac and Linux in addition to the existing iOS and Android apps.

In January 2017 Sparkassen Financial Services Group deployed Teamwire as a secure messenger for the bank. In May 2017 it became public that the police in the state of Bavaria in Germany uses Teamwire as a secure alternative to WhatsApp.
