= ElasticHosts =

Cloud computing service provider

- Type: Subsidiary Company
- Industry: Cloud computing
- Founded: 2008
- Headquarters: Slough, England
- Key people: Richard Davies, Founder
- Website: www.elastichosts.com

ElasticHosts was a computer service provider based in London, England. It was founded in March 2008, and closed on 30 June 2020. It provided a cloud computing service, which used ten data centres; in the United Kingdom (two sites), Netherlands, United States (four sites), Canada, Hong Kong and Australia.

== Company ==
ElasticHosts was privately held and competed with other public cloud-infrastructure providers such as Amazon Elastic Compute Cloud and Rackspace Cloud. According to CEO Richard Davies, the company aimed to provide servers that were set up as similar as possible to how one would provision dedicated hosting, with the exception that the customer can self-serve at any time.

ElasticHosts' EU hosting data centres are in the UK and not Ireland. It is the first public cloud service built on Linux Kernel-based Virtual Machine (rather than Xen), and it has an API that has been given a good review from a REST perspective. It charges for resources (CPU, memory, disk and network) as separate entities, allowing customers to build virtual machines with widely different characteristics instead of simply categorized ones, such as small, medium and large instances.

ElasticHosts (and therefore licensees) are supported directly by BoxGrinder included in Fedora 15 as of May 2011.

== Services ==
- Cloud Servers are virtualized on-demand servers, designed to behave like physical servers. Cloud Servers can be managed via their web control panel or API.
- Containers
- Managed Cloud Servers take care of the set up and management of servers. Management is offered by a partner company called Cloudways.
- Cloud Websites provide redundant, scalable hosting for websites. This is offered by partner company Hybrid Sites.
- Reseller and referrer programs offered by Elastichosts, include one called White-Label. The White-Label Reseller Program allows companies to rebrand Elastichosts cloud hosting platform and resell it.
- Elasticstack is the underlying software to provide cloud Infrastructure as a Service (IaaS). This is available as a licensed product, and several other companies around the world use the same infrastructure, licensed from ElasticHosts Ltd, to provide their own branded IaaS cloud to their customers.

ElasticHosts Cloud Servers are available from ten data centres; San Jose, Los Angeles, Dallas, Miami, Maidenhead (UK), Portsmouth (UK), Amsterdam, Toronto, Hong Kong and Sydney.

=== Storage ===
ElasticHosts only has persistent storage, based on local host store. However, in 2012 it announced solid-state drives (SSD) for all instance sizes. It does not use a storage area network, but instead has directly attached RAID arrays, with iSCSI interconnects between hosts. In 2011 the CEO predicted a greater demand for storage.

=== Elastic IP addresses ===
ElasticHosts has two types of IPv4 addresses - static and dynamic. Both are allocated from the same pools of addresses, but static addresses are kept by the account, and can be allocated to any account's server at any time. Dynamic ones are randomly allocated for any server that has not been specifically allocated a static IP address. These are not guaranteed to remain the same, though remain for the lifespan of the instance. A shutdown of the virtual machine may or may not reallocate the IP address. ElasticHosts does not lock a static IP to a server instance - they can be reallocated from the control panel. Reverse DNS is managed by the customer from the control panel.

=== Elastic Containers ===
Elastichosts announced on 14 April 2014 that in addition to maintaining their traditional cloud VM business, they were releasing an alternate type of server, based on Linux running within containers. This implementation, similar to chroot or BSD jails uses the more advanced Linux kernel Control Groups feature, which the company deemed mature enough to use as the basis for a new type of cloud server, launched under the name "Elastic Containers". Claiming this as a world first in terms of virtualization, the company currently offers versions of Debian, Ubuntu and Centos - though because of the nature of the containers, all run with the host's Linux kernel. Containers in and of themselves are not a new technology, with the cgroups features first begun being added to the Linux kernel in 2007; and other companies such as Docker Inc. producing software that uses them to virtualize applications; this is claimed as the first time an IaaS provider has used the technology for full operating system use.

Various press articles focused on the newly released pay as you go billing option, whereby the container can optionally be billed for actual usage, as opposed to some fixed instance size, in 15 minute increments; where the common industry standard is 1 hour time blocks for cloud server rentals. In particular the CEO's claim that customers could save up to 50% on traditional costs using the service. Some analysts expressed confidence that container based systems had to be the future for cloud providers; "Given the fiercely competitive nature of cloud pricing these days, it’s hard to see how containers won’t become a dominant mechanism for delivering cloud services." though others wondered whether this would actually pull customers from the dominating players in the market - Owen Rogers, senior analyst for digital economics at 451 Research, noted that though the “interesting and unique” model did give Elastichosts an advantage, with the "... rest of the market ... still based on virtual machines, and I can¹t see this changing overnight”; but wondered whether "... consumers really care about ElasticHosts’ more detailed – and arguably fairer – method of pricing, when its bigger competitors are slashing prices"

=== Sale ===
ElasticHosts was acquired by Paragon Internet Group in April 2016. Paragon itself was acquired by Host Europe Group in late 2015. Host Europe Group was acquired by GoDaddy in December 2016, meaning that ElasticHosts was ultimately a subsidiary of GoDaddy prior to Godaddy's decision to close the brand as from 30 June 2020.

== See also ==
- Cloud infrastructure
- Cloud computing
- Containerization (computing)
