= Dracut (software) =

Software to automate the Linux boot process

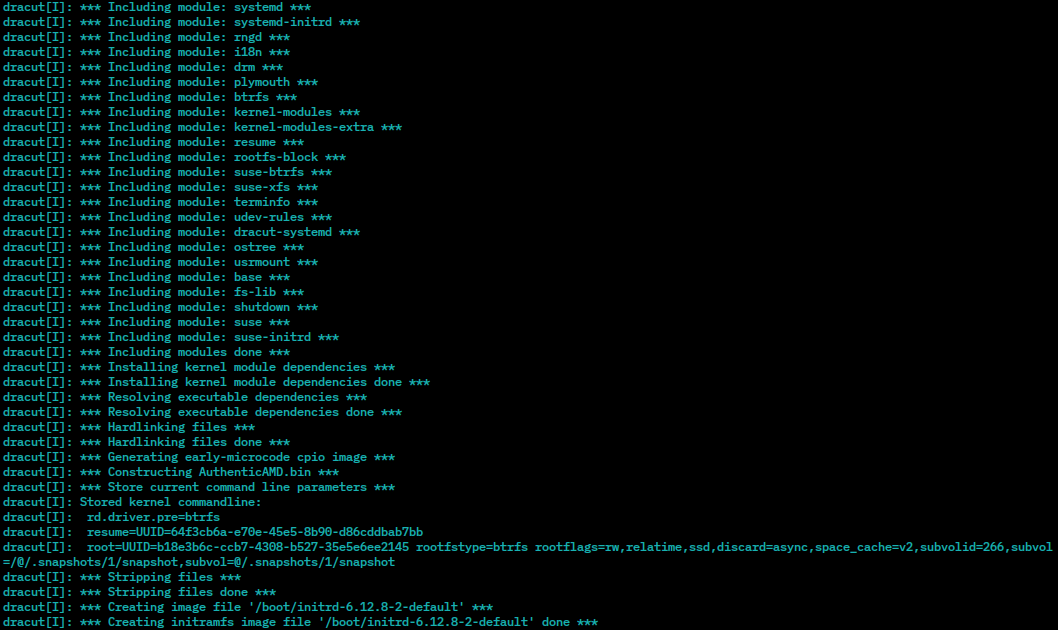
- Output of dracut regenerating initramfs
- Original authors: Harald Hoyer and others
- Release: July 2009; 17 years ago
- Stable release: 111 / 2 May 2026; 2 months ago
- Written in: C, Bash, Rust
- Operating system: Linux
- Platform: Linux kernel
- Type: Initial ramdisk
- License: GPLv2+, LGPLv2+
- Website: dracut-ng.github.io/dracut/
- Repository: github.com/dracut-ng/dracut-ng

Dracut is a set of tools that provide enhanced functionality for automating the Linux boot process. The tool named dracut is used to create a Linux boot image (initramfs) by copying tools and files from an installed system and combining it with the Dracut framework.

The initramfs has essentially one purpose: locating and mounting the real root file system so that the boot process can transition to it. This functionality is dependent on device availability. Therefore, instead of having hard-coded scripts to determine device availability and suitability, Dracut's initramfs depends on the Linux device manager (udev) to create symbolic links to device nodes. When the root file system's device node appears, Dracut mounts it as the new root file system. This helps to minimize the time required in initramfs such that, for example, 5-second boots are possible.

Most of the initramfs generation functionality in Dracut is provided by generator modules that are sourced by the main dracut tool to install specific functionality into the initramfs. They live in the modules subdirectory, and use functionality provided by dracut-functions to do their work.

== Features ==
Dracut supports booting from direct attached storage

- ext2, ext3, ext4
- XFS, F2FS, jfs
- btrfs
- ZFS
- MD RAID
- Device mapper, dmraid, dm-integrity, dm-verity
- lvm
- device mapper multipath I/O
- LUKS, dm-crypt, eCryptfs
- Virtiofs, Virtfs
- SquashFS, EROFS, iso
- OverlayFS

Dracut supports booting from network storage

- CIFS
- FCoE
- iSCSI
- NBD
- NFS

Dracut supports the following architectures

- i386, i686, X86-64
- AArch64, ARM architecture family
- MIPS architecture
- ppc64
- S390x

Dracut can use the following shells

- bash
- dash
- ash

Dracut supports the following init systems

- systemd
- OpenRC (Gentoo)
- busybox (Alpine Linux)
- runit (Void Linux)
- sysVinit (CRUX, Slackware, Devuan, MX Linux)

Dracut can be used for live media generation. It has flags for squashfs, and other things like overlay file system.

== History ==
Dracut originated from Fedora Linux, sponsored initially by Red Hat in Dec 2008. Dracut is named after the town of Dracut, similar to Wayland and Weston. This follows the tradition of Red Hat naming projects after places near what was then the company's engineering headquarters in Westford, Massachusetts.

In 2013, the development moved to GitHub from Kernel.org, while a mirror was maintained till 2022 (v56).

As of October 2021, after the long time lead developer Harald Hoyer left Red Hat it is a community-managed open source project.

In Mar 29 2024, the project was moved to a new code repository by the core team after the project leader had not been heard from for several months.

In Feb 2025, Ubuntu announced a plan to switch the default initramfs infrastructure from initramfs-tools to dracut.

== Adoption ==
Distributions that depend on the dracut project for initramfs generation. The list is sorted by the date when dracut (partially or fully) became the dependency for generating initramfs by default for a given distribution.

- Fedora Linux (2009, version 12 Constantine)
- Red Hat Enterprise Linux (2010, version 6)
- Gentoo (2010 for custom kernels, 2020 for distribution kernels)
- openmamba (2010)
- OpenMandriva Lx (2011, Mandriva Linux), Mageia (2012, version 2)
- Void Linux (2012)
- Solus (2013)
- Endless OS (first Debian based) (2014), gardenlinux (2020)
- openSUSE (2014, version 13.2)
- SUSE Linux Enterprise (2014, version 12)
- Adelie Linux (2017)
- ALT Linux (2020)
- PhotosOS (2015), Azure Linux (2024)
- AOSC OS (2021)
- KaOS (2021)
- CRUX (2021)
- EndeavourOS (first Arch based) (2022), Garuda Linux (2023, Raptor)
- Alpaquita Linux (first Alpine based) (2023)
- Ubuntu (2011, version 11.04 universe repository), (2024-Feb dracut-install in main repository, Lubuntu moved to dracut by default), Ubuntu 26.04 LTS
- Debian (2010, version 6 Squeeze), (2024-March, dracut-install)
- Chimera Linux (2024-Jun, dracut-install)
- Side Linux (2024-Sept)

Most distributions have made the dracut package available to allow replacing the distribution's default initramfs generator. Significant (but incomplete) list of these distributions:

- Arch Linux (2019, extra repository)
- Alpine Linux (2022, community repository)
- NixOS (2023)
- T2 SDE
- OpenEmbedded
- Slackware (2024-Sept)

== Applications ==
Notable projects using dracut exclusively for initramfs generation

- OSTree
- fai
- kiwi
- afterburn
- ignition
- combustion
- stratis
- warewulf
- Freedeskop SDK (GNOME OS, org.freedesktop.Platform runtime for flatpak application)
- bootengine
- immucore
- clevis
- Cray-HPE
- FIDO Device Onboard (FDO)
- brltty
- Uyuni Saltboot
- zfsbootmenu
