= Anthony TS Ho =

British computer scientist

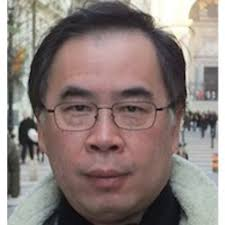
- Born: Hong Kong
- Citizenship: United Kingdom, Canada
- Education: King's College London, Imperial College, Northumbria University
- Known for: watermarking, steganography, steganalysis, digital forensics, biometrics, Benford's law
- Scientific career
- Fields: Computer Science
- Workplaces: University of Surrey, Nanyang Technological University, Singapore

Anthony TS Ho (何东旋教授) is a British computer scientist and Professor of Multimedia Security at the University of Surrey.

== Biography ==
Anthony TS Ho received his PhD in Digital Image Processing at King's College London in 1983. He was awarded an MSc in Applied Optics at Imperial College in 1980. Prior to that, he graduated with a BSc in Physical Electronics from Newcastle Polytechnic (now Northumbria University) in 1979. From 1994 to 2015, he was a Senior Lecturer, then associate professor at Nanyang Technological University, Singapore. He moved to the University of Surrey in 2006 as Professor of Multimedia Security, and was Head of the Department of Computer Science from 2010 until 2015. He was awarded the Tianjin Distinguished Visiting Professorship by the Tianjin Municipal Commission of Education, Tianjin, China in 2016, hosted by the Tianjin University of Science and Technology. He has also been a visiting professor at Wuhan University of Technology, Wuhan, China and the University of Malaya, Kuala Lumpur, Malaysia.

Ho is internationally known for his research in digital watermarking, digital forensics, steganography and steganalysis. He was the recipient of the prestigious Institution of Engineering and Technology Innovation in Engineering Award under the Security category for his research and commercialisation work on digital watermarking in 2006. His current focus and interest is on the applications of Benford's law in digital forensics and anomaly detection, which he has presented a number of keynotes at international conferences. He currently serves on a number of international editorial boards including as Founding Editor-in-Chief of the International Journal on Information Security and Applications (JISA).

== Selected books ==
- Ho, Anthony TS; Li, Shujun (2015). Handbook of Digital Forensics of Multimedia Data and Devices]. John Wiley and IEEE. doi:10.1109/MSP.2015.2488018. S2CID 13612284.
- Ho, Anthony TS; Shi, Yun Q; Kim, H J; Barni, Mauro (2009). Digital Watermarking]. Lecture Notes in Computer Science. Vol. 5703. Springer. doi:10.1007/978-3-642-03688-0. ISBN 978-3-642-03687-3.
