= List of cryptographic file systems =

This is a list of filesystems with support for filesystem-level encryption. Not to be confused with full-disk encryption.

== General-purpose filesystems with encryption ==
- AdvFS on Digital Tru64 UNIX
- Novell Storage Services on Novell NetWare and Linux
- NTFS with Encrypting File System (EFS) for Microsoft Windows
- OpenZFS open source, in illumos, and from 2020 unified on Linux, macOS, FreeBSD, NetBSD and OSv
- ZFS proprietary, for Oracle Solaris, since Pool Version 30
- Ext4, added in Linux kernel 4.1 in June 2015
- F2FS, added in Linux kernel 4.2
- UBIFS, added in Linux kernel 4.10
- CephFS, added in Linux kernel 6.6
- bcachefs (experimental), added in Linux kernel 6.7
- APFS, macOS High Sierra (10.13) and later.

== Cryptographic filesystems ==
=== FUSE-based file systems ===
| File system | Latest release |
|---|---|
| gocryptfs | 2025 |
| CryFS | 2025 |
| securefs | 2024 |
| Rclone | 2026 |
Discontinued projects
| EncFS | 2018 |
| LessFS | 2013 |
| MetFS | 2012 |
| CryptoFS | 2007 |
| Magikfs | 2006 |
| PhoneBookFS | 2004 |

=== Integrated into the Linux kernel ===
- eCryptfs
- Rubberhose filesystem (discontinued)
- StegFS (discontinued)

=== Integrated into other UNIXes ===
- geli on FreeBSD
- EFS (Encrypted File System) on AIX

== See also ==
- Comparison of disk encryption software
