= Harald Hoyer =

Computer programmer and a photographer well known for his dracut initramfs generator

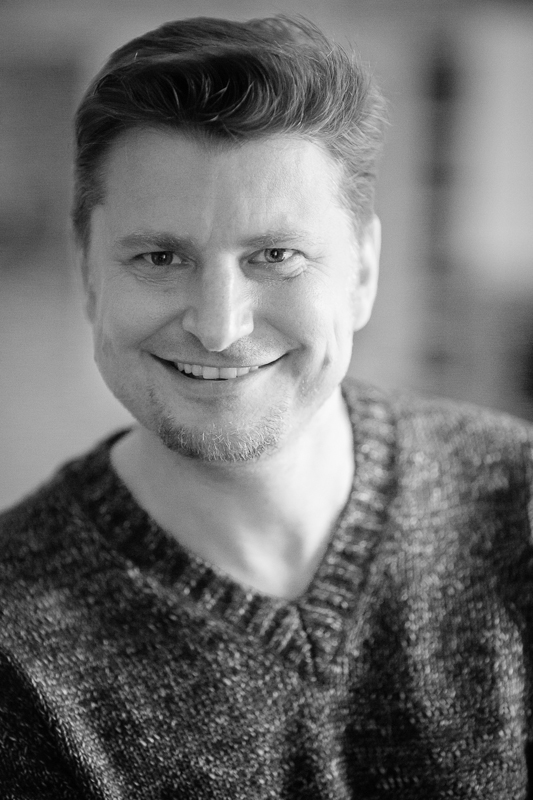
- Born: December 4, 1971 (age 54)
- Occupation: Software engineer
- Employer: Matter Labs
- Known for: dracut, Gummiboot
- Website: harald.hoyer.xyz

Harald Hoyer is a computer programmer and photographer, best known for developing the dracut initramfs generator and framework, the udev device manager of Linux, the systemd replacement for the System V init daemon and the Gummiboot EFI boot loader. Harald Hoyer also made various contributions to the Linux Kernel, starting 1997. In 2012, together with Kay Sievers, Hoyer was the main driving force behind merging the /lib, /bin and /sbin file system trees into /usr in the Fedora distribution

He is employed by Subzero Labs

Harald Hoyer resides in Vaterstetten, Germany.
