= Sky Fortress (drone defense system) =

Drone defense system

Sky Fortress is an acoustic early-warning drone defense system developed in Ukraine for detecting Shahed-136 drones initially.

Acoustic sensors consisting of mounted microphones and smartphones on poles, AI and machine learning enable the detection of approaching low-flying drones, which produce a characteristic sound. The system is significantly cheaper than existing air defense systems.

Deployed in 2022 it uses as of 2026 more than 10 thousand acoustic sensors across Ukraine. As of April 2026 the Sky Fortress platform has been deployed by the U.S. military at the Prince Sultan Air Base in Saudi Arabia as part of the defense against Shahed drones launched during the 2026 Iran war.
