= StegFS =

- Full name: steganographic file system
- Introduced: with Linux kernel

Other
- Supported operating systems: Linux

StegFS is a free steganographic file system for Linux based on the ext2 filesystem. It is licensed under the GPL. It was principally developed by Andrew D. McDonald and Markus G. Kuhn, who developed versions 1.0.0 to 1.1.4.

In 2003, Andreas C. Petter and Sebastian Urbach intended to continue development of StegFS, and created a site for it on SourceForge.net. StegFS was updated to use GNU's libgcrypt, and version 2015.08 was released on August 13, 2015. The latest version of StegFS is 2015.08.1, released July 21, 2016.

== Version History ==
The first version of StegFS was 1.0.0, released on September 17, 1999. Development versions continued to be released, up to version 1.1.4, released on February 14, 2001. StegFS was then rewritten by Ashley Anderson and Andreas Petter, who released version 2015.08 on August 13, 2015. 2015.08 was a complete rewrite and was not backwards compatible with 1.0.0 through 1.1.4.

== See also ==
- Filesystem-level encryption
- List of cryptographic file systems
