= BPCS-steganography =

Computer message obfuscation technology

BPCS-steganography (Bit-Plane Complexity Segmentation steganography) is a type of digital steganography.

Digital steganography can hide confidential data (i.e. secret files) very securely by embedding them into some media data called "vessel data." The vessel data is also referred to as "carrier, cover, or dummy data". In BPCS-steganography true color images (i.e., 24-bit color images) are mostly used for vessel data. The embedding operation in practice is to replace the "complex areas" on the bit planes of the vessel image with the confidential data. The most important aspect of BPCS-steganography is that the embedding capacity is very large. In comparison to simple image based steganography which uses solely the least important bit of data, and thus (for a 24-bit color image) can only embed data equivalent to 1/8 of the total size, BPCS-steganography uses multiple bit-planes, and so can embed a much higher amount of data, though this is dependent on the individual image. For a 'normal' image, roughly 50% of the data might be replaceable with secret data before image degradation becomes apparent.

== Principle of embedding ==
The Human visual system has such a special property that a too-complicated visual pattern can not be perceived as "shape-informative." For example, on a very flat beach shore every single square-foot area looks the same - it is just a sandy area, no shape is observed. However, if you look carefully, two same-looking areas are entirely different in their sand particle shapes. BPCS-steganography makes use of this property. It replaces complex areas on the bit-planes of the vessel image with other complex data patterns (i.e., pieces of secret files). This replacing operation is called "embedding." No one can see any difference between the two vessel images of before and after the embedding operation.

An issue arises where the data to be embedded appears visually as simple information, if this simple information replaces the complex information in the original image it may create spurious 'real image information'. In this case the data is passed through a binary image conjugation transformation, in order to create a reciprocal complex representation.

== Present status of research and development ==
This form of steganography was proposed jointly by Eiji Kawaguchi and Richard O. Eason in 1998. Their experimental program (titled Qtech Hide & View) is freely available for educational purposes. Recently, many researchers are tackling its algorithm improvement and applications as well as resistibility studies against steganalysis.

== See also ==
- Steganography
- Steganography tools
- Steganographic file system
- Steganography detection
