= Enterprise Volume Management System =

Integrated volume management software

EVMS
- Final release: 2.5.5 / February 26, 2006; 19 years ago
- Written in: C
- Operating system: Linux kernel
- Type: Volume management
- License: GNU General Public License
- Website: evms.sourceforge.net

Enterprise Volume Management System (EVMS) was a flexible, integrated volume management software used to manage storage systems under Linux.

Its features include:

- Handle EVMS, Linux LVM and LVM2 volumes
- Handle many kinds of disk partitioning schemes
- Handle many different file systems (Ext2, Ext3, FAT, JFS, NTFS, OCFS2, OpenGFS, ReiserFS, Swap, XFS etc.)
- Multi-disk (MD) management
- Software RAID: level 0, 1, 4 and 5 (no support for level 6 and 10)
- Drive linking (device concatenation)
- Multipath I/O support
- Manage shared cluster storage
- Expand and shrink volumes and file systems online or offline (depending on the file system's capabilities)
- Snapshots (frozen images of volumes), optionally writable
- Conversion between different volume types
- Move partitions
- Make, check and repair file systems
- Bad block relocation
- Three types of user interface: GUI, text mode interface and CLI
- Backup and restore the EVMS metadata

EVMS is licensed under the GNU General Public License version 2 or later. EVMS is supported now in some Linux distributions, among others it is now (2008) SUSE, Debian and Gentoo

== LVM vs EVMS ==
For a while, both LVM and EVMS were competing for inclusion in the mainline kernel. EVMS had more features and better userland tools, but the internals of LVM were more attractive to kernel developers, so in the end LVM won the battle for inclusion. In response, the EVMS team decided to concentrate on porting the EVMS userland tools to work with the LVM kernelspace.

Sometime after the release of version 2.5.5 on February 26, 2006, IBM discontinued development of the project. There have been no further releases. In 2008 Novell announced that the company would be moving from EVMS to LVM in future editions of their SUSE products, while continuing to fully support customers using EVMS.
