= Kay Sievers =

Computer programmer

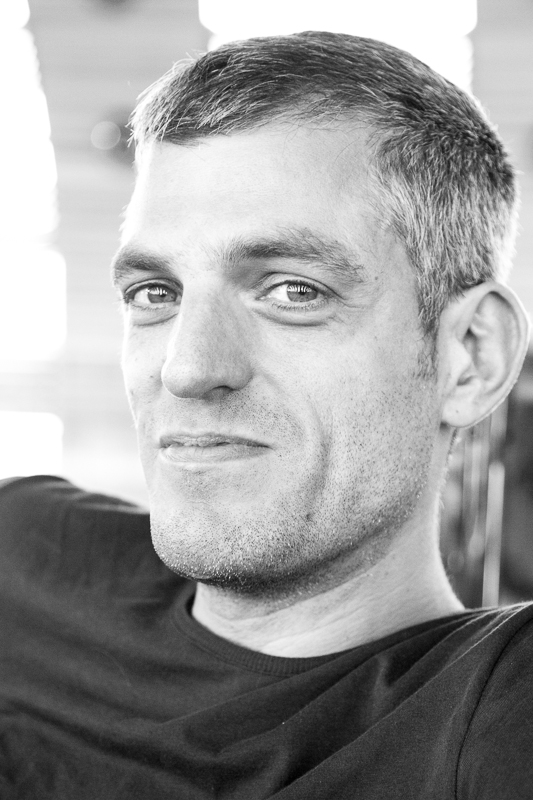
- Occupation: Software engineer
- Known for: udev, systemd, Gummiboot

Kay Sievers is a German computer programmer, best known for developing the udev device manager of Linux, systemd and the Gummiboot EFI bootloader.

== Biography ==
Kay Sievers made major contributions to Linux's hardware hotplug and device management subsystems. In 2012, together with Harald Hoyer, Sievers was the main driving force behind Fedora's merging of the /lib, /bin and /sbin file-system trees into /usr, a simplification which other distributions such as Arch Linux have since adopted.

In April 2014, Linus Torvalds banned Sievers from submitting patches to the Linux kernel for failing to deal with bugs that caused systemd to negatively interact with the kernel.

Kay Sievers worked for Red Hat, Inc. until 2019. Sievers previously worked for Novell.

Kay Sievers grew up in East Germany and nowadays resides in Berlin, Germany.
