= Detection =

Being seen by someone or something

In general, detection is the action of accessing information without specific cooperation from or with the sender; it is "the fact of noticing or discovering something".

In the history of radio communications, the term "detector" was first used for a device that detected the simple presence or absence of a radio signal, since all communications were in Morse code. The term is still in use today to describe a component that extracts a particular signal from all of the electromagnetic waves present. Detection is usually based on the frequency of the carrier signal, as in the familiar frequencies of radio broadcasting, but it may also involve filtering a faint signal from noise, as in radio astronomy, or reconstructing a hidden signal, as in steganography.

In optoelectronics, "detection" means converting a received optical input to an electrical output. For example, the light signal received through an optical fiber is converted to an electrical signal in a detector such as a photodiode.

In steganography, attempts to detect hidden signals in suspected carrier material is referred to as steganalysis. Steganalysis has an interesting difference from most other types of detection, in that it can often only determine the probability that a hidden message exists; this is in contrast to the detection of signals which are simply encrypted, as the ciphertext can often be identified with certainty, even if it cannot be decoded.

In the military, detection refers to the special discipline of reconnaissance with the aim to recognize the presence of an object in a location or ambiance, either literally (for example, enemy forces massing on the border) or by extension (as in a defense system or computer system).

In medicine, medical devices can provide detection for medical conditions, such as heart conditions by a stethoscope, or the detection of seizures in premature babies.

Finally, the art of detection, also known as following clues, is the work of a detective in attempting to reconstruct a sequence of events by identifying the relevant information in a situation. In law enforcement, it is "the fact of the police discovering information about crimes".

== See also ==
- Detection dog
- Object detection
- Signal detection theory
