= Multipath I/O =

Redundant IO technology

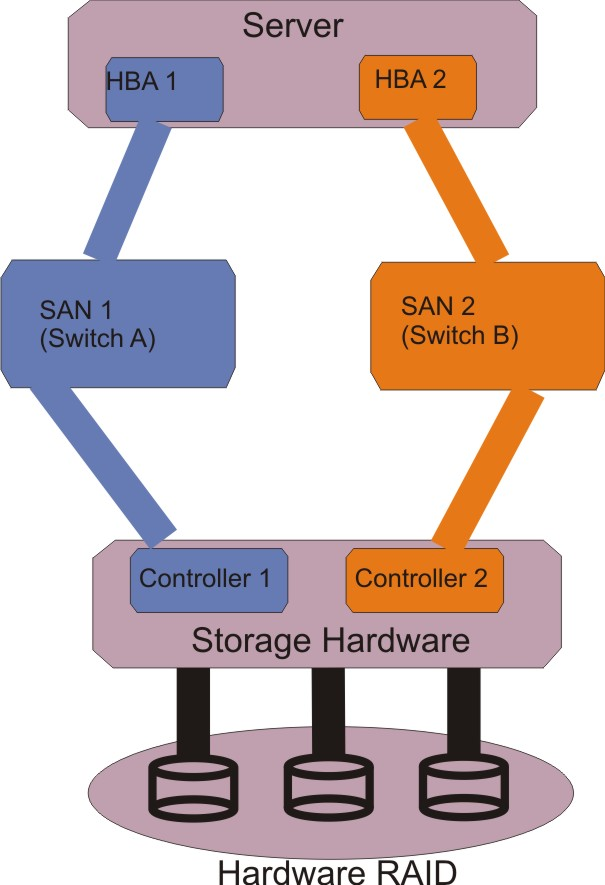
Multipath access to a RAID using Linux DM Multipath (Legend: "HBA" = Host bus adapter, "SAN" = Storage area network)

In computer storage, multipath I/O (MPIO) is a fault-tolerance and performance-enhancement technique that defines more than one physical path between the central processing unit (CPU) in a computer system and its mass-storage devices through the buses, controllers, switches, and bridge devices connecting them.

== Technique ==
As an example, a SCSI hard disk drive may connect to two SCSI controllers on the same computer, or a disk may connect to two Fibre Channel (FC) ports. Should one controller, port or switch fail, the operating system can route the input/output (I/O) through the remaining controller, port or switch transparently and with no changes visible to the applications, other than perhaps resulting in increased latency.

Multipath software layers can leverage the redundant paths to provide performance-enhancing features, including dynamic load balancing, traffic shaping, automatic path management, and dynamic reconfiguration.

== See also ==
- Device mapper
- Linux DM Multipath
- Host bus adapter (HBA)
- Storage area network (SAN)
