= Tianjin University of Science and Technology =

Municipal public university in Tianjin, China

Coordinates: 39.0841°N 117.7075°E

- 天津科技大学
- Former names: Hebei Institute of Light Industry (1958–1968); Tianjin Institute of Light Industry (1968–2002)
- Motto: 尚德尚学尚行，爱国爱校爱人
- Type: Public university
- Established: 1958
- President: Lu Fuping
- Location: Tianjin, China
- Website: tust.edu.cn en.tust.edu.cn

The Tianjin University of Science and Technology (TUST; 天津科技大学) is a municipal public university in Binhai, Tianjin, China. It is affiliated with the City of Tianjin and funded by the municipal government. Founded as Hebei Institute of Light Industry in 1958, it received university status in 2002.

Founded in 1958, the school was named Hebei Institute of Light Industry (河北轻化工学院). It was one of the first four light industry undergraduate colleges in the country and was affiliated to the Ministry of Light Industry of China. In 1959, following the State Council's higher education reorganization order, most faculty members and experimental equipment of the Pulp and Paper Department of Tianjin University were transferred to the school. In 1964, the fermentation engineering department of the Beijing Institute of Light Industry and the plastic molding and processing department of the Wuxi Institute of Light Industry were successively transferred to the school. In 1968, the school was renamed Tianjin Institute of Light Industry (天津轻化工学院).

In 1971, the entire Pulp and Paper Department of Tianjin University was transferred to the school. In 1972, the Department of Salt Chemistry of the Beijing Institute of Light Industry and the Tanggu Salt Industry College of the Ministry of Light Industry merged and were placed under the school. In 1998, the school's management system was changed to a joint construction between the central government and the local government, with Tianjin as the main management. In 2002, with the approval of the Ministry of Education, the school was renamed Tianjin University of Science and Technology.
