= Filesystem-level encryption =

Method of data encryption

Filesystem-level encryption, often called file-based encryption, FBE, or file/folder encryption, is a form of disk encryption where individual files or directories are encrypted by the file system itself.

This is in contrast to the full disk encryption where the entire partition or disk, in which the file system resides, is encrypted.

Types of filesystem-level encryption include:

- the use of a 'stackable' cryptographic filesystem layered on top of the main file system
- a single general-purpose file system with encryption

The advantages of filesystem-level encryption include:

- flexible file-based key management, so that each file can be and usually is encrypted with a separate encryption key
- individual management of encrypted files e.g. incremental backups of the individual changed files even in encrypted form, rather than backup of the entire encrypted volume
- access control can be enforced through the use of public-key cryptography, and
- the fact that cryptographic keys are only held in memory while the file that is decrypted by them is held open.

== General-purpose file systems with encryption ==
Unlike cryptographic file systems or full disk encryption, general-purpose file systems that include filesystem-level encryption do not typically encrypt file system metadata, such as the directory structure, file names, sizes or modification timestamps. This can be problematic if the metadata itself needs to be kept confidential. In other words, if files are stored with identifying file names, anyone who has access to the physical disk can know which documents are stored on the disk, although not the contents of the documents.

One exception to this is the encryption support being added to the ZFS filesystem. Filesystem metadata such as filenames, ownership, ACLs, extended attributes are all stored encrypted on disk. The ZFS metadata relating to the storage pool is stored in plaintext, so it is possible to determine how many filesystems (datasets) are available in the pool, including which ones are encrypted. The content of the stored files and directories remain encrypted.

Another exception is CryFS replacement for EncFS.

== Cryptographic file systems ==
Cryptographic file systems are specialized (not general-purpose) file systems that are specifically designed with encryption and security in mind. They usually encrypt all the data they contain – including metadata. Instead of implementing an on-disk format and their own block allocation, these file systems are often layered on top of existing file systems e.g. residing in a directory on a host file system. Many such file systems also offer advanced features, such as deniable encryption, cryptographically secure read-only file system permissions and different views of the directory structure depending on the key or user ...

One use for a cryptographic file system is when part of an existing file system is synchronized with 'cloud storage'. In such cases the cryptographic file system could be 'stacked' on top, to help protect data confidentiality.

== See also ==
- Steganographic file system
- List of cryptographic file systems
- Disk encryption
- Full disk encryption
