= Hardware watermarking =

Hardware watermarking is a technique used to protect the intellectual property (IP) of integrated circuit (IC) designs. It involves embedding hidden marks into the design’s functional or non-functional elements without impacting the intended functionality, enabling designers to prove ownership. These watermarks can be implemented at various abstraction levels—from high-level design constraints to physical layout—making them versatile for different design and verification flows. In the semiconductor supply chain, the IP owner typically sells IP cores in various forms—soft (RTL), firm (gate-level), or hard (GDSII)—to the SoC integrator, who is responsible for designing the final product. The SoC integrator acquires IPs from various vendors, integrates them with in-house designs, and performs logic synthesis to build the system’s gate-level design. Physical synthesis, including tasks like placement and routing, may be handled by the SoC integrator or outsourced to third-party service providers. Once physical synthesis is complete, the design is sent to a semiconductor foundry for manufacturing, packaging, and testing. Since the SoC design and production cycle involves multiple untrusted parties, there is a risk that the foundry or system integrator may misuse the design, violating the original licensing agreement with the third party IP (3PIP) owner. Hardware watermarking is therefore essential to address such illegal exploitations like IP theft, overuse, or copyright violations. An ideal watermarking technique should be easy to embed and verify while introducing minimal overhead and maintaining strong resistance to attacks. Its resiliency is often measured by two key metrics: a low probability of coincidence (to ensure uniqueness) and a high tolerance to tampering (to withstand potential removal or modification attempts). The SoC design flow using third-party IPs, along with the watermark embedding and verification process, is illustrated below in Fig. 1:

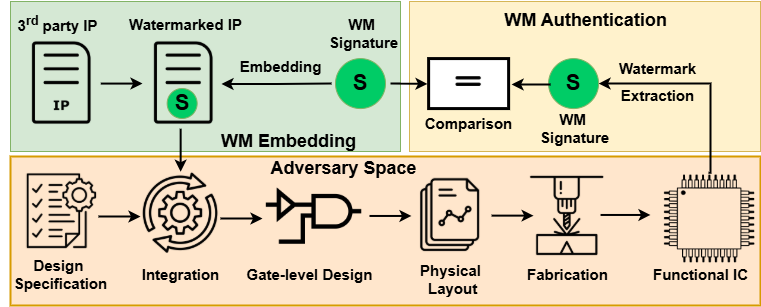
Fig. 1. Watermark embedding and verification flow for Hardware IPs.

Note: Hardware watermarking is a passive defense that cannot prevent IP piracy but can prove ownership in cases of suspected infringement or illegal usage of IP within an SoC.

== Process of hardware watermarking ==
Hardware or IP core watermarking are significantly different from watermarking of images/digital content. IP Cores are usually complex in size and nature and thus require highly sophisticated mechanisms to implant signatures within their design without altering its functional behavior. Depending on the desired abstraction level and security requirements, different embedding strategies are applied using appropriate EDA tools and design techniques. Existing hardware watermarking techniques roughly fall into five categories: (a) Constraint-based (b) Finite State Machine (FSM)-based (c) Side-channel-based (d) Test structure-based (e) DSP-based watermarking.

=== Constraint-based watermarking ===
Constraint-based watermarking techniques integrate a watermark by introducing additional design constraints that encode the IP owner’s signature without altering the intended functionality of the IP. These methods can be applied at multiple abstraction levels in the design flow.

At the system and behavioral synthesis levels, designers can use high-level synthesis (HLS) tools to embed watermarks early in the design process. At the system level, designers often apply node partitioning with stego constraints during Graph partitioning tasks, which can shape the design for subsequent synthesis stages. Constraint-based watermarking can also be integrated at various phases of HLS, including scheduling, register binding, functional unit binding, and interconnect binding. NP-hard optimization problems—such as task scheduling, resource assignment, transformations, Resource allocation, and template mapping—are well-suited for embedding watermarks at the behavioral synthesis level. Recently, biometric-based watermarking schemes have also emerged as a unique variant of constraint-based approaches, where biometric data such as voice, fingerprints, or facial features are transformed into design constraints. For example, a voice biometric-based technique extracts features such as jitter, shimmer, pitch, and intensity from a unique voice sample to generate hardware security constraints, which are then integrated during the register allocation phase using high-level synthesis (HLS) to secure IP cores.

At the logic synthesis level, designers can embed watermarks during the transformation of abstract RTL descriptions into optimized gate-level implementations. Multilevel logic minimization and technology mapping are key optimization tasks in this phase and are well-suited for constraint-based watermarking. For example, technology mapping can utilize disjoint closed cones within the logic network, selectively remapped based on slack and sustainability metrics to incorporate a watermark signature.

At the physical synthesis level, Authorship signatures can be embedded during key steps—such as placement, clock tree synthesis, scan chain reordering, and routing—and later verified after fabrication. Tools like Cadence Innovus and Synopsys IC Compiler support the implementation of these physical-level constraints. These techniques are not applicable to soft IPs and watermark authentication often involves partial or full reverse engineering—such as delayering and imaging of the IC layout.

=== Finite State Machine (FSM)-based watermarking ===
FSM-based watermarking integrates watermark signatures into the finite state machine (FSM) of a design by modifying its state transition graph (STG) at the behavioral synthesis level. This approach leverages the state space expansion in FSMs to embed concealed watermarks and can be broadly categorized into two main techniques: transition-based and state-based. In transition-based watermarking, designers exploit the free inputs of states in the STG to add extra transitions that carry the watermark signature. For example, flexible sets of hybrid Cellular Automaton (CA) rules can manage don’t-care states to conceal the watermark, which can then be authenticated using variable challenge-response pairs (CRPs). State-based watermarking expands the state space of the FSM to hide the watermark signature among new states without affecting design functionality. These methods allow IP owners to embed authorship claims directly into the control logic of their designs, offering strong resistance to removal and tampering attacks.

=== Side-channel-based watermarking ===
Side-channel-based watermarking leverages observable physical phenomena such as power consumption, electromagnetic (EM) or optical emissions to conceal or verify a watermark signature in an IP core. These methods often incorporate additional dynamic power-consuming components, such as ring oscillators (ROs) or shift registers, into the functional IP blocks to embed a signature in the power side-channel without directly interfering with the IP’s intended functionality. Some techniques reduce overhead by reusing existing components like gated registers or s-box elements to create unique power or EM signature. By monitoring these side-channel characteristics, IP owners can authenticate ownership facilitating non-invasive verification.

=== Test structure-based watermarking ===
Test structure-based watermarking techniques integrate a digital identifier into the test circuitry of an IP core during logic synthesis level. This approach typically leverages Scan chain and Automatic test pattern generation (ATPG) methods to insert watermarks that can later be verified through test vectors. By integrating the watermark within the test structures, IP owners can assert authorship during manufacturing tests without altering the IP’s normal operational functionality. A key concept in this technique is combining a test sequence with the watermark-generating circuit at the behavioral design level, ensuring that the watermark remains traceable even after the IP is integrated into a full SoC and packaged. During test mode, the selected IP sends output test patterns along with watermark sequences, allowing the IP provider’s identity to be determined from the watermark sequence.

=== DSP-based watermarking ===
DSP-based watermarking approaches modify the design specification of digital signal processing (DSP) IPs to include a watermark signature without compromising performance. For instance, it may involve modifying a filter’s decibel (dB) characteristics to encode a n-bit watermark signature.

== Attacking and defending watermarks ==
Watermarking techniques are subject to various attacks that aim to compromise their integrity or mislead ownership claims. Common attacks include removal or tampering, which involves modifying, damaging, or removing the embedded watermark through reverse engineering or design rollback; and forging, where an attacker embeds a forged watermark into the designs to create false ownership claims.

Defensive strategies have been developed to mitigate these threats. Watermark obfuscation techniques conceal the watermark’s structure, making it harder for attackers to detect and remove. Multiple small watermarks can be distributed across the design, increasing resilience by making tampering more difficult and detection more reliable. Parity in watermarks employs error detection principles, using mechanisms such as XOR parity checks to detect and potentially repair tampering attempts. These defense mechanisms strengthen the overall robustness of watermarking schemes, helping to ensure reliable authorship verification even in the presence of adversarial efforts to compromise or remove the watermark.

== See also ==
- Hardware obfuscation
- Semiconductor intellectual property core
- Electronic design automation
- High-level synthesis
- Logic synthesis
- Physical design (electronics)
- Resource Allocation
- Side-channel attack
- Scan chain
- Automatic test pattern generation
- Graph partitioning
