= CFST =

CFST may refer to:

- Concrete filled steel tube, a construction technique
- French Army Special Forces Command
- CFst, "state Coupling Faults" in the March Algorithm
- Centre of Food Science & Technology at Banaras Hindu University
- Compassion Fatigue Self Test
