= Fault grading =

Fault grading is a procedure that rates testability by relating the number of fabrication defects that can in fact be detected with a test vector set under consideration to the total number of conceivable faults.

It is used for refining both the test circuitry and the test patterns iteratively, until a satisfactory fault coverage is obtained.

== See also ==
- Automatic test pattern generation
- Design for Test
