= Hideo Fujiwara =

Japanese computer scientist

- 藤原 秀雄
- Born: February 9, 1946; Nara, Japan
- Education: Osaka University
- Known for: FAN algorithm
- Awards: IEEE Life Fellow; IEEE Computer Society Golden Core Member Award; IEICE Fellow; IPSJ Fellow; IEEE TTTC Lifetime Contribution Medal; IEEE TTTC Outstanding Contribution Awards
- Scientific career
- Fields: Electronic engineering
- Workplaces: Osaka University, Meiji University, Nara Institute of Science and Technology (NAIST), Osaka Gakuin University

Hideo Fujiwara (藤原 秀雄, Fujiwara Hideo) is a Japanese computer scientist who made significant contributions to ATPG (automatic test pattern generation) algorithms. As one of his works, he invented the FAN algorithm in 1983, which was the fastest ATPG algorithm at that time, and was adopted by industry.

He was born in Nara, Japan, and studied electronic engineering at Osaka University, where he received his B.E. degree in 1969, M.E. in 1971, and Ph.D. in 1974. He was with Osaka University from 1974 to 1985, Meiji University from 1985 to 1993, Nara Institute of Science and Technology (NAIST) from 1993 to 2011, and Osaka Gakuin University from 2011 to 2021. Presently, he is Professor Emeritus of NAIST.
