= Logic built-in self-test =

Logic built-in self-test (or LBIST) is a form of built-in self-test (BIST) in which hardware and/or software is built into integrated circuits allowing them to test their own operation, as opposed to reliance on external automated test equipment.

== Advantages ==
The main advantage of LBIST is the ability to test internal circuits having no direct connections to external pins, and thus unreachable by external automated test equipment. Another advantage is the ability to trigger the LBIST of an integrated circuit while running a built-in self test or power-on self test of the finished product.

== Disadvantages ==
LBIST that requires additional circuitry (or read-only memory) increases the cost of the integrated circuit. LBIST that only requires temporary changes to programmable logic or rewritable memory avoids this extra cost, but requires more time to first program in the BIST and then to remove it and program in the final configuration. Another disadvantage of LBIST is the possibility that the on-chip testing hardware itself can fail; external automated test equipment tests the integrated circuit with known-good test circuitry.

== Related technologies ==
Other, related technologies are MBIST (a BIST optimized for testing internal memory) and ABIST (either a BIST optimized for testing arrays or a BIST that is optimized for testing analog circuitry). The two uses may be distinguished by considering whether the integrated circuit being tested has an internal array or analog functions.

== See also ==
- Built-in self-test
- Built-in test equipment
- Design for test
- Power-on self-test
