= Transistor fault =

A transistor fault is a fault model used to describe faults for CMOS logic gates. A transistor may be stuck-short or stuck-open. In stuck-short, a transistor behaves as it is always conducts (stuck-on). In stuck-open, a transistor never conducts current (stuck-off). Stuck-short will usually produce a short between VDD and VSS.

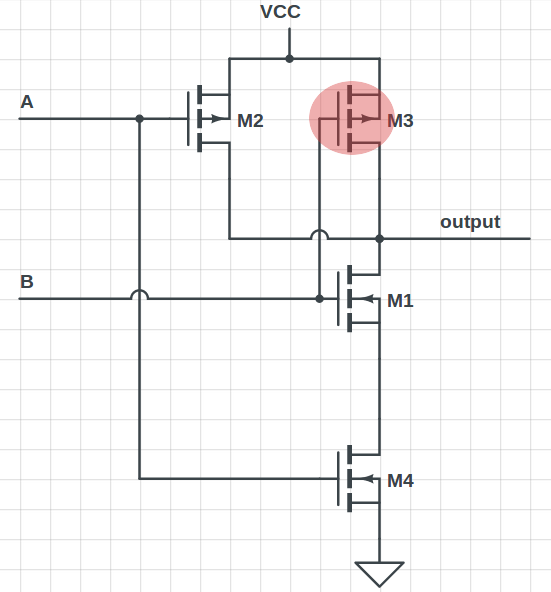
A Transistor fault in a CMOS NAND gate

In the example picture, a faulty PMOS transistor in a CMOS NAND Gate is shown (M3-highlighted transistor). If M3 is stuck-open, then in case we apply A=1 and B=0 then the output of the circuit will become Z. And if M3 is stuck-short, then the output will always be connected to 1, and it also may short VCC to GND in case we apply A=B=1.
