= Built-in test equipment =

Equipment built into airborne systems to support maintenance processes

Built-in test equipment (BITE) for avionics primarily refers to passive fault management and diagnosis equipment built into airborne systems to support maintenance processes. Built-in test equipment includes multimeters, oscilloscopes, discharge probes, and frequency generators that are provided as part of the system to enable testing and perform diagnostics.

The acronym BIT is often used for this same function or, more specifically, in reference to the individual tests.

BIT often includes:

- The detection of the fault
- The accommodation of the fault (how the system actively responds to the fault)
- The annunciation or logging of the fault to warn of possible effects and/or aid in troubleshooting the faulty equipment.

== Functionality ==
- Analysis of failure monitoring results
- Reporting and memorization of failures
- Management of tests
- Having the set adequate parameters for the different components

== See also ==
- Built-in self-test
- Logic built-in self-test
- Software fault tolerance
