= Anthony Perkins =

American actor (1932–1992)

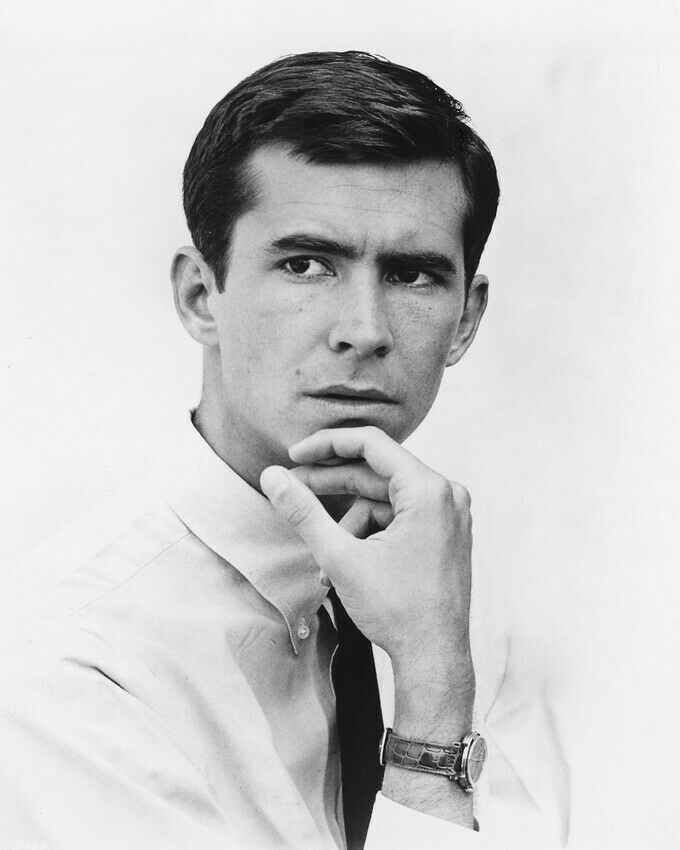
- Perkins, c. 1960
- Born: April 4, 1932; New York City, U.S.
- Died: September 12, 1992 (aged 60); Los Angeles, California, U.S.
- Education: Rollins College; Columbia University
- Occupations: Actor; singer; director; screenwriter
- Years active: 1953–1992
- Spouse: Berry Berenson (m. 1973)
- Partners: Tab Hunter (1955–1959); Grover Dale (1964–1971)
- Children: Osgood; Elvis
- Father: Osgood Perkins

Anthony Perkins (April 4, 1932 – September 12, 1992) was an American actor. He is best known for portraying Norman Bates in Alfred Hitchcock's 1960 film Psycho.

Perkins' first film role was in The Actress (1953). The next year, he debuted on Broadway in Tea and Sympathy, a performance for which he received critical acclaim. In 1956, he played his first major film role in Friendly Persuasion, which earned him a Golden Globe Award for Best New Actor of the Year and a nomination for the Academy Award for Best Supporting Actor. Following the film's success, he signed a seven-year contract with Paramount Pictures, where he was regarded as the studio's last matinee idol. In 1957, he starred in Fear Strikes Out. During this period, Paramount promoted Perkins in romantic roles and he also embarked on a singing career. He also took on more dramatic roles, including the Broadway production of Look Homeward, Angel, for which he was nominated for a Tony Award, and the film On the Beach (1959).

Psycho, a horror thriller in which he was cast against type, then profoundly changed his image, after which Perkins moved to France and worked for several years in Europe. The first film he made there, Goodbye Again (1961), earned him a Cannes Film Festival Award for Best Actor and a David di Donatello for Best Actor. His other European films include Orson Welles' The Trial (1962). He returned to American cinema with Pretty Poison (1968). Other films include Catch-22 (1970), for which he was nominated for a National Society of Film Critics Award for Best Supporting Actor (shared with his role in WUSA, also released in 1970), The Life and Times of Judge Roy Bean (1972), Murder on the Orient Express (1974), Mahogany (1975) and Crimes of Passion (1984). In the later part of his career, Perkins often portrayed troubled, neurotic or mentally unstable characters. He reprised the role of Norman Bates in Psycho II (1983), Psycho III (1986), and Psycho IV: The Beginning (1990). His performance in Psycho III, which he also directed, earned him a nomination for the Saturn Award for Best Actor.

His final acting role was in the NBC television film In the Deep Woods, which aired a month after his death on September 12, 1992, from AIDS-related causes.

== Early life ==
=== Early childhood: 1932–1937 ===
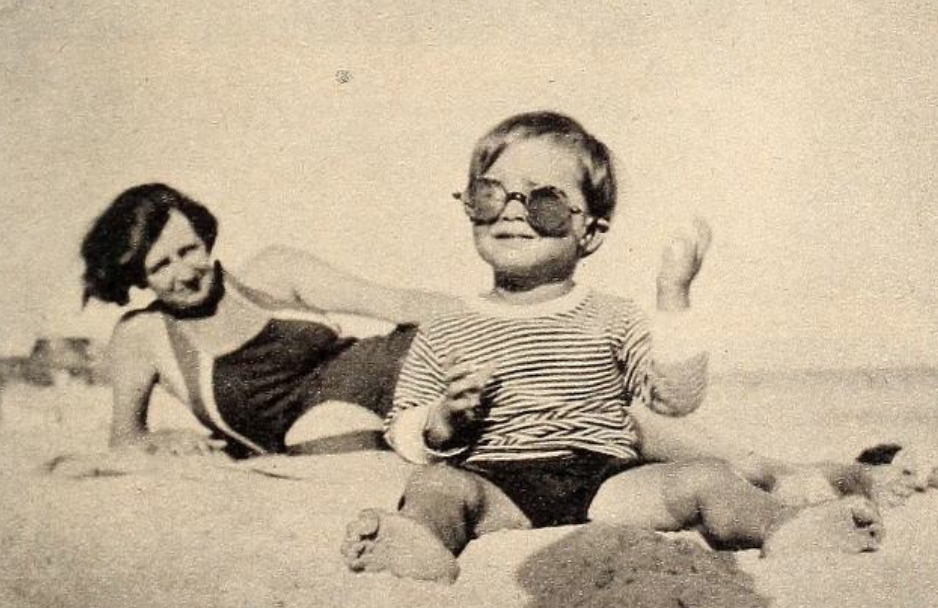
Perkins with his mother Janet at the beach, c. 1933

Anthony Perkins was born on April 4, 1932, in Manhattan, New York City, the son of actor Osgood Perkins (1892–1937) and Janet Esselstyn (née Rane; 1894–1979). His paternal great-grandfather was the wood engraver Andrew Varick Stout Anthony. Throughout his early years, Perkins had limited contact with his father, who was occupied with acting roles.

The family employed a French nanny named Jeanne, which led to Perkins's fluency in French. In a 1983 interview with People magazine, he recalled, "I became abnormally close to my mother; whenever my father came home I was jealous. It was the Oedipal thing in a pronounced form, I loved him but I also wanted him to be dead so I could have her all to myself."

Osgood Perkins died of a heart attack on September 21, 1937. Following his father's death, Perkins experienced intense feelings of guilt. He later stated, "I was horrified. I assumed that my wanting him to be dead had actually killed him. I prayed and prayed for my father to come back. I remember long nights of crying in bed. For years I nursed the hope that he wasn't really dead. Because I'd see him on film, it was as if he were still alive. He became a mythic being to me, to be dreaded and appeased."

=== After his father's death: 1937–1947 ===
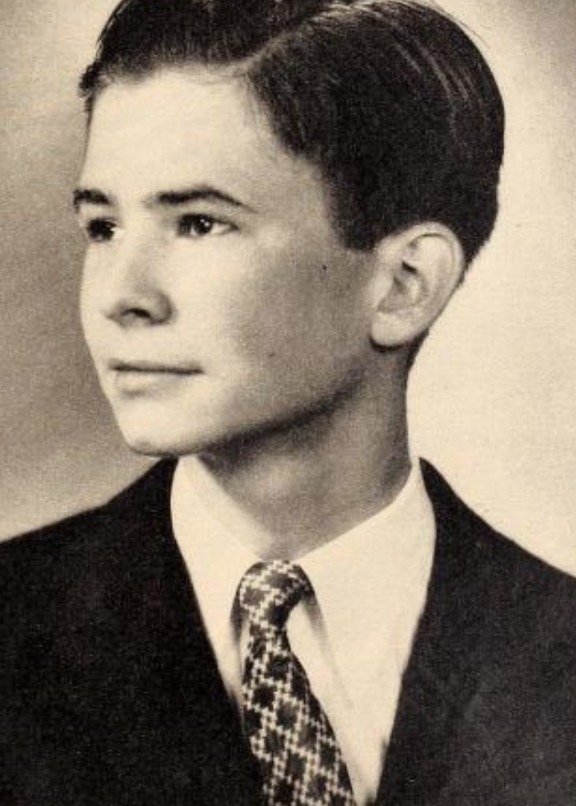
Perkins in a school photograph, 1940s

A consistent female companion in Perkins's life was aspiring playwright Michaela O'Harra, who developed a close relationship with his mother. According to accounts from those who knew the family, including childhood friend John Kerr, the bond between O'Harra and Perkins's mother was notably intimate. While the exact nature of their rapport has been subject to interpretation, it has been widely suggested they were in a lesbian relationship. It was also during that time that Perkins's mother, according to his account, began to sexually abuse him. Perkins said, in a 1983 interview, "She was constantly touching me and caressing me. Not realising what effect she was having, she would touch me all over, even stroking the inside of my thighs right up to my crotch." The behavior continued into his adulthood.

In 1942, when Perkins was ten years old, his family moved to Boston. Through her connections in the theatre industry, his mother secured a position at the American Theatre Wing's Boston Stage Door Canteen, where she managed many of the canteen's operations. The job provided financial support for the two of them. When she was occupied with work, Perkins was often sent to stay with his grandmother.

During this period, Perkins began to struggle at the public school he attended. He was described as a "gifted drifter" and began exhibiting rebellious behaviour, which was attributed to his mother's neglect. In response, she enrolled him at Brooks School in North Andover, Massachusetts. The experience proved difficult: his childhood stutter reemerged, he avoided athletic activities, and his mother insisted he participate in baseball. The pressure of the new environment led to extended school absences during his second year due to consecutive bouts of scarlet fever, and his academic performance declined.

Perkins eventually negotiated with his mother that if he improved his grades, he would be permitted to return to Boston for school the following year. He subsequently ranked in the top third of his class. His headmaster noted that Perkins was significantly more mature than his peers and lacked interest in many of their typical activities. Following this improvement, he was allowed to transfer back to Boston.

=== Summer stock: 1947–1950 ===
As Perkins matured, the absence of his father became increasingly significant to him. According to his mother, as he observed other boys with their fathers, he began to feel the loss of his own more acutely. His connection to his late father developed through an interest in theatre. To support this interest, a family friend who operated a summer stock company agreed to allow Perkins to participate in minor roles, initiating his early involvement in summer stock theater.

Perkins's first experience was with the Brattleboro Summer Theater in Vermont, where he performed small parts in Junior Miss, Kiss and Tell, and George Washington Slept Here. In addition to acting, he worked in the box office, earning $25 per week and obtaining his Equity card. The following year, in keeping with an earlier promise, his mother enrolled him at Buckingham Browne & Nichols School, an all-boys school in Cambridge, Massachusetts. There, he distinguished himself and gained a reputation as the class magician and pianist. He was known for his impersonations, including a popular imitation of actor Roddy McDowall, which he frequently performed between classes.

In 1948, Perkins returned to summer stock theatre, this time at the Robin Hood Theatre in Arden, Delaware, where his mother had secured a position as a manager. He again ran the box office and took on stage roles. His most notable performance that summer was in Sarah Simple. During this time he met Charles Williamson, the first boy to whom he was attracted romantically.

The following academic year, Perkins joined the varsity tennis team and the glee club at school. He also became co-literary editor of the school newspaper, The Spectator, to which he occasionally contributed articles. Around this period, Perkins began to question his sexuality.

=== College: 1950–1953 ===
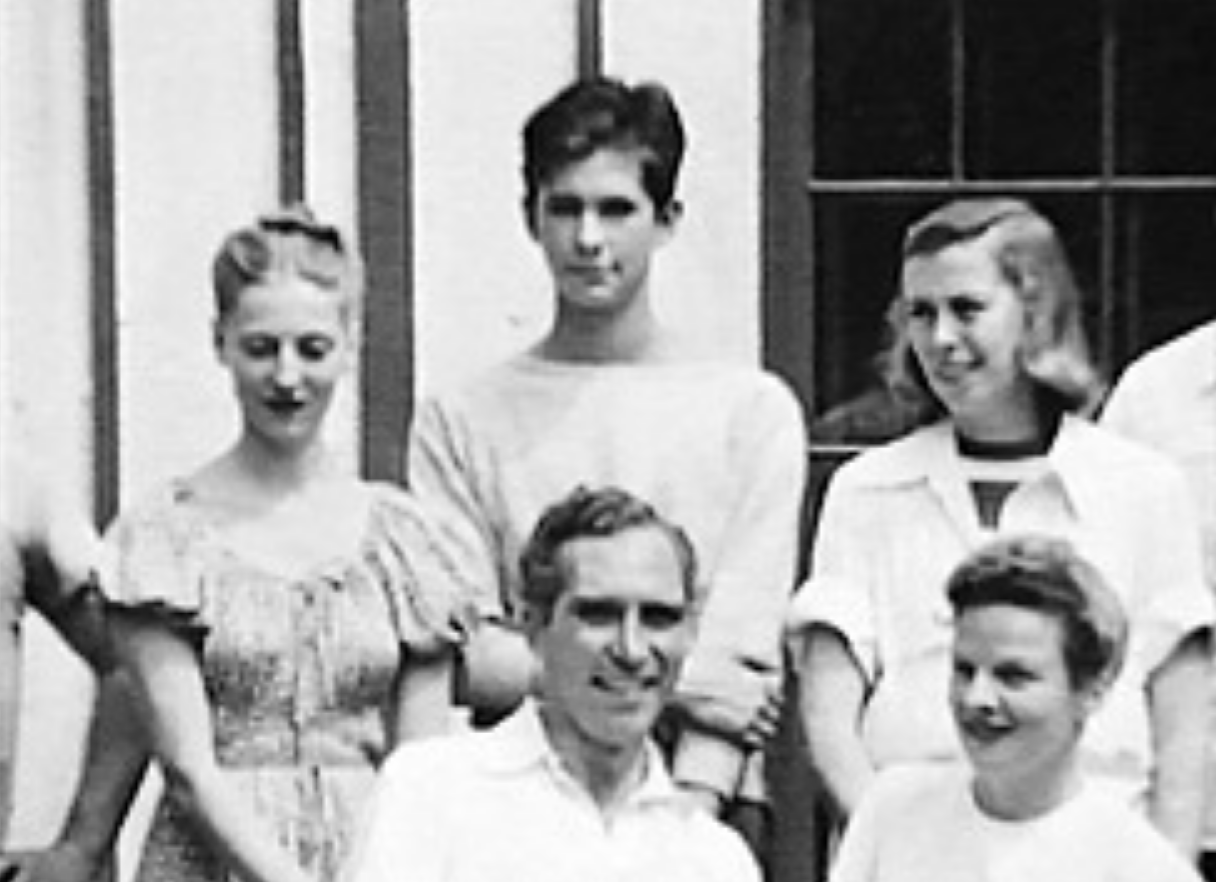
Perkins (top row, center) in a summer stock company, c. 1950

After Perkins graduated from high school in 1950, he enrolled at Rollins College in Winter Park, Florida, having been persuaded to attend after a college representative visited his school.

That summer, Perkins returned to the Robin Hood Theatre in Delaware, which had by then become a prominent summer stock venue. While working there, he reconnected with Charles Williamson. They spent time together during breaks, including having lunch and swimming. Perkins developed a romantic attraction to Williamson during this time, though the feelings were not expressed or acted upon.

During that summer, Perkins also played the role of Fred Whitmarsh in Years Ago, a part he would later reprise in its film adaptation.

At Rollins College that fall, Perkins struggled to find the same sense of community he had previously experienced. His arrival coincided with a period marked by heightened scrutiny and discrimination against gay individuals, later known as the Lavender Scare. There were a few supportive peers, including Fred Rogers, who would later become known as a children's television host; Rogers allowed Perkins to use his piano, which he appreciated.

Perkins participated in several stage productions and frequently changed fraternities, a pattern that frustrated his mother. During his time at Rollins, he reportedly began to explore his sexuality more openly. Not long after his arrival, a number of homosexual students—many of whom were his acquaintances—were expelled and arrested after a fellow student had beaten one of them. According to Perkins's biographer Charles Winecoff, who interviewed former alumni, Perkins's association with a theater professor helped him avoid disciplinary action.

Despite avoiding expulsion, his association with those involved led to growing tension between him and other students, who knew of Perkins's sexuality. As a result of the increasingly hostile environment, Perkins transferred to Columbia University in New York City.

== Career ==
=== 1950s ===
==== Film and Broadway debut ====
While still a student at Rollins College, Perkins traveled to California during summer vacation in hopes of beginning a film career. Aware that Metro-Goldwyn-Mayer was producing a screen adaptation of Years Ago, he spent time around the studio lot, hoping to be noticed by a casting director and offered a screen test.

Perkins later recounted that he spent the summer running errands and delivering food for the studio guards. During a screen test for Margaret O'Brien, a director needed someone to appear in the background, and a studio worker suggested using Perkins. He was called in to stand in front of the camera, and when the director asked him to move, he responded, drawing attention to himself. This unplanned appearance led to his involvement in the screen test.

Later that summer, Perkins was cast in the role of Fred Whitmarsh in the film adaptation, retitled The Actress (1953), alongside Jean Simmons and Spencer Tracy. The film was directed by George Cukor, who had been collaborator and friend of Perkins's late father.

Perkins gained wider recognition in 1954 when he replaced John Kerr in the lead male role of Tea and Sympathy on Broadway, directed by Elia Kazan, another friend of his father. In the play, he portrayed Tom Lee, a college student perceived as homosexual who experiences personal growth through a romantic encounter with a woman. It was one of the first major Broadway productions to depict homosexuality explicitly, and it attracted a significant gay audience. Perkins had auditioned for the play with the prospect of co-starring with Deborah Kerr, whom he idolized and who helped him relax during his reading. However, one disappointment was that shortly after he was cast, Kerr was replaced by Joan Fontaine with whom he had no chemistry. Nevertheless, the role bore autobiographical parallels for Perkins, and he later described it as one of the most meaningful performances of his career.

Joan Fickett, who played opposite Perkins in the play, commented on his suitability for the role, noting the authenticity and emotional depth he brought to the character. The play's success and Perkins's performance drew renewed interest from Hollywood.

According to biographer Charles Winecoff, Perkins was drafted during the run of Tea and Sympathy, despite the Korean War having recently ended; he then informed the Selective Service that he was a "practicing homosexual" to be deemed unfit for military service. Having to reveal his orientation reportedly left Perkins deeply affected.

==== Serious roles ====
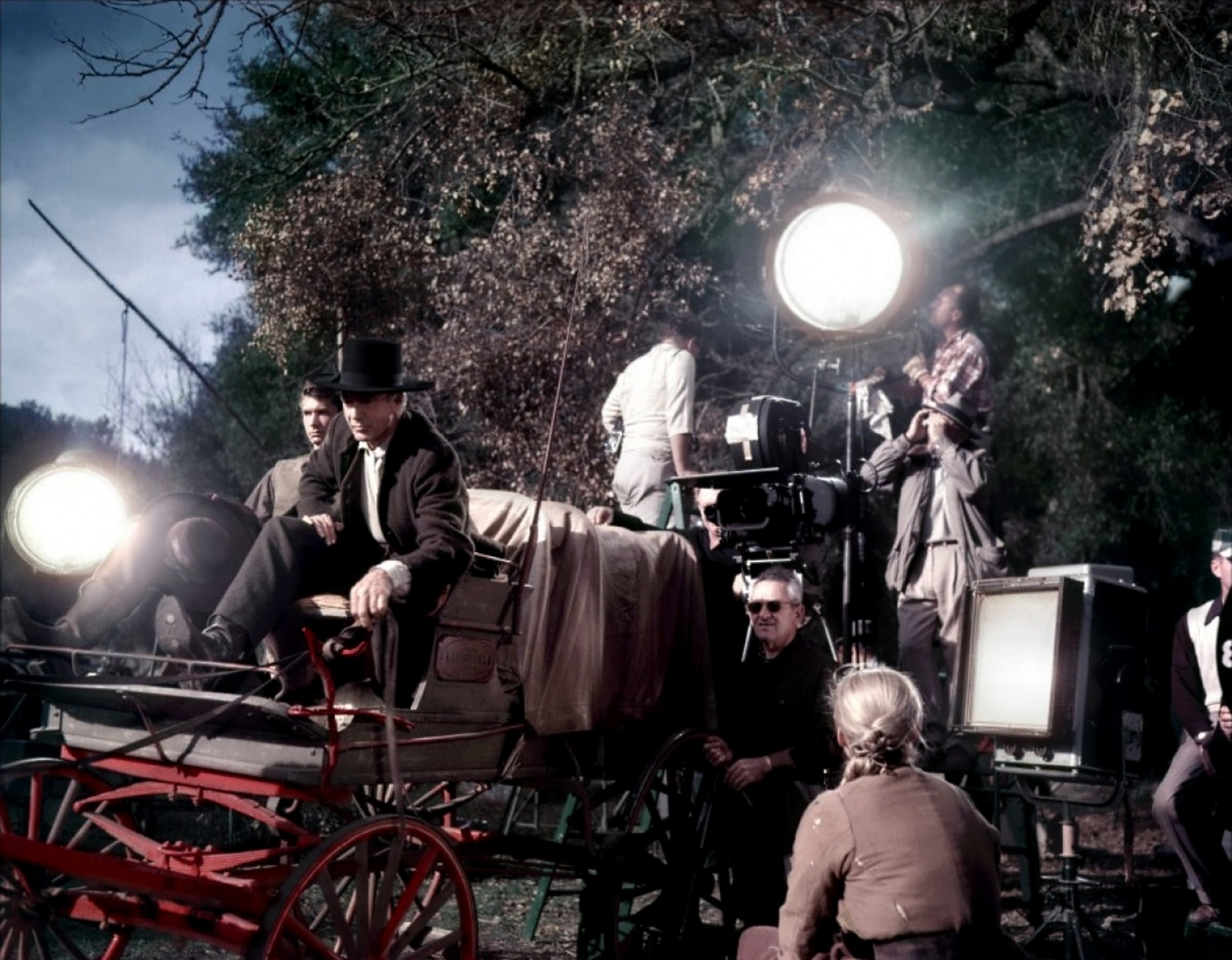
Perkins, seated left in carriage, and Gary Cooper, seated right, filming Friendly Persuasion (1956)

As Perkins's run in Tea and Sympathy concluded, director William Wyler dispatched his assistant, Stuart Millar, to scout talent on Broadway for the upcoming film Friendly Persuasion, which focused on a Quaker family during the American Civil War. Millar attended a performance of Tea and Sympathy and invited Perkins to audition for the role of Josh Birdwell, the family's eldest son. According to Millar, Perkins was cast shortly after his audition. At the time, Perkins had been offered the lead role in Dancing in the Checkered Shade, a play by John Van Druten. In a 1956 interview, he stated, "My agents were split in their decisions. New York said I should stay and do the play. Hollywood said I should come out and do [Friendly Persuasion]. It was like flipping a coin. So I took the picture." He then traveled to Hollywood to begin filming alongside Dorothy McGuire and Gary Cooper, who played his on-screen parents. Eventually, Dancing in the Checkered Shade did not make it to Broadway, while Friendly Persuasion gave a decisive boost to Perkins's film career.

At the time, Perkins did not know how to drive and hitchhiked from his hotel, the Chateau Marmont, to the film set, a fact that was widely noted in fan magazines. His partner, Tab Hunter, later taught him how to drive. Perkins's lack of experience was noted by those on set, including actor Peter Mark Richman, who stated that Gary Cooper was supportive of both himself and Perkins. Wyler reportedly praised Perkins's performance, and Cooper began to publicly support Perkins's acting career. The two appeared together on the July 1956 cover of Life magazine, in which Cooper spoke favorably of Perkins. Cooper's daughter, Maria Cooper Janis, later suggested that her father's support may have stemmed from both admiration for Perkins's talent and empathy for the challenges faced by closeted gay actors in Hollywood.

Friendly Persuasion was released to critical and commercial success. Perkins received the Golden Globe Award for Best New Actor and a nomination for the Academy Award for Best Supporting Actor.

Following positive feedback from early film footage, Paramount Pictures signed Perkins to a seven-year semi-exclusive contract, allowing him flexibility to continue stage work. He was their last matinee idol and was called the "fifteen million dollar gamble". His first film under the contract was the 1957 biographical drama Fear Strikes Out, about baseball player Jimmy Piersall. The set was hostile and riddled with homophobia, which negatively affected Perkins during production. Nonetheless, his performance received critical acclaim, with The Hollywood Reporter noting: "Every recent young star has been compared to James Dean. From now on the standard is Tony Perkins."

Perkins subsequently appeared in the 1957 Western The Lonely Man, co-starring Jack Palance. Reportedly, the film set was riddled with tensions, particularly between Palance and Perkins, which was exacerbated by delays due to weather. Perkins's next Western was The Tin Star (1957), in which he starred alongside Henry Fonda. Though producers Bill Perlberg and George Seaton reportedly expressed reluctance to cast him, Perkins auditioned and was selected. During production, Perkins and Fonda took the hours-long drive out to the set together in the same car, during which they became closely acquainted. The Tin Star grossed over $1 million and is now regarded as a classic of the genre.

Friend Gwen Davis remembered that at this point in his career, Perkins was "intellectually dazzling, physically beautiful. At twenty-four, he was already Dorian Gray." Costar Joan Fickett spoke similarly of Perkins: "Tony had a quality that was fantastic ... He was also a beautiful-looking young man." In 1958, Newsweek described Perkins as "possibly the most gifted dramatic actor in this country under 30".

==== Teen idol status ====
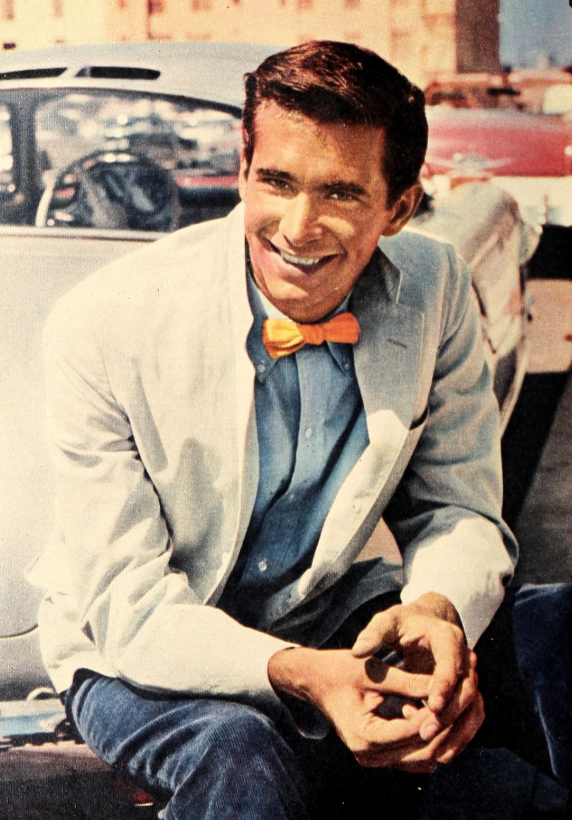
Perkins in a 1957 publicity still for Modern Screen

In 1956, while Perkins he was being groomed by Paramount as a teen idol, he demonstrated his singing ability by performing songs in the TV program Joey and in Friendly Persuasion. This led him to sign a contract with Epic Records. In 1957 and 1958, he released three pop music albums and several singles under the name Tony Perkins through Epic and RCA Victor. His 1957 single "Moon-Light Swim" reached number 24 on the Billboard Hot 100. In 1958, "The Prettiest Girl in School" gained popularity in Australia but did not chart successfully in the United States. Perkins's musical pursuits were contemporaneous with the success of his then-partner Tab Hunter's debut single "Young Love", which topped the charts, and may have influenced Perkins's interest in music. Perkins was insecure about his singing talent and later expressed disappointment about that aspect of his career, calling his voice "terrible" and his discography a "second rate art". He continued to record albums and EPs intermittently into the mid-1960s.

Although he was a life member of the Actors Studio, Perkins did not pursue roles in musical theatre. Instead, in 1957, he used the flexibility of his studio contract to return to Broadway in Look Homeward, Angel. Perkins played Eugene Gant, with Jo Van Fleet portraying his mother. The production ran successfully, and in 1958 Perkins was nominated for the Tony Award for Best Actor in a Play. Reports from the production indicated tensions during rehearsals, particularly involving Van Fleet, whose behavior was described by some contemporaries as difficult. Among the audience during tryouts was Tab Hunter, who later recalled that Perkins initially gave a restrained performance, but showed significant growth later in the run.

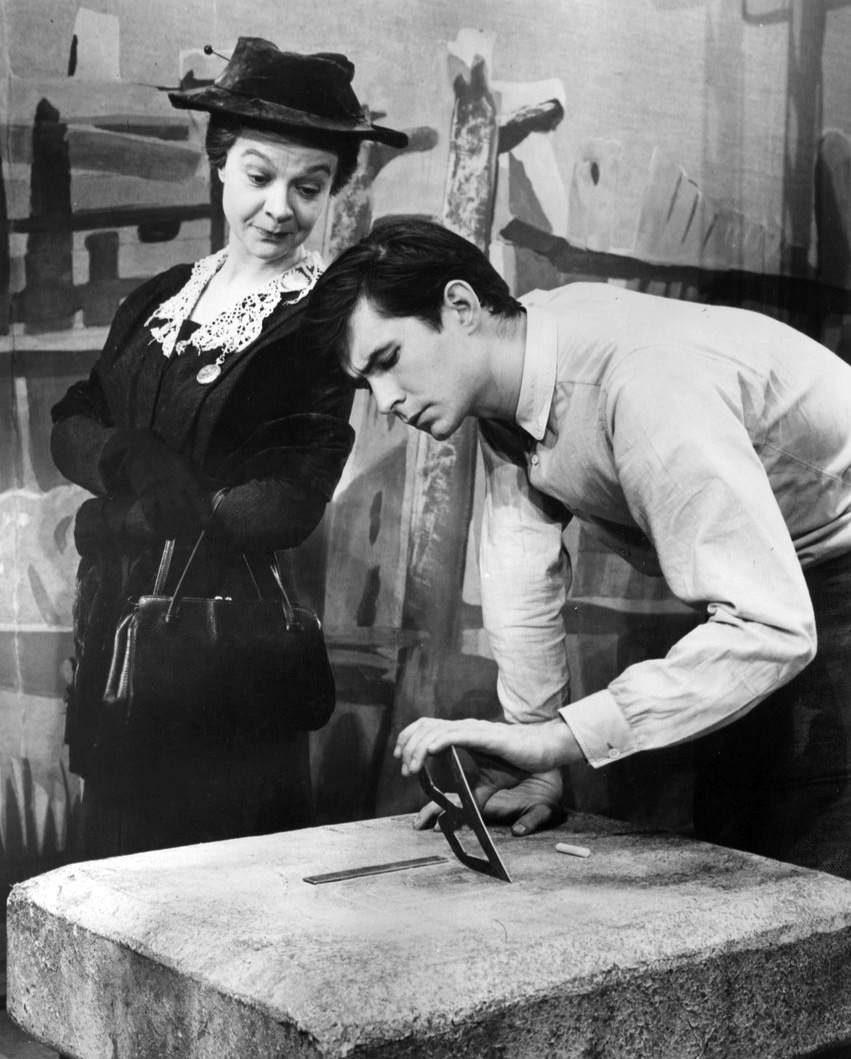
Perkins with Jo Van Fleet in Look Homeward, Angel, 1957

Despite reported tensions during rehearsals for Look Homeward, Angel, the set was not without levity. Perkins's dressing room was located far from the stage, requiring him to move quickly between scenes to avoid missing cues. Cast members occasionally set up obstacles backstage as a practical joke to see if he could return in time. According to accounts, Perkins consistently made his entrances. On the day of his final performance, the cast repeated the prank, and upon successfully navigating the obstacles, he was met with a sign reading "We love you, Tony!"

In 1958, Perkins co-starred with Silvana Mangano in This Angry Age, in which he was also reunited with Jo Van Fleet. That same year, he starred in Desire Under the Elms, alongside Sophia Loren in her first American screen kiss. In her 2014 memoir, Loren described Perkins as polite and gentle, yet visibly restless. She recalled their on-set dynamic positively, noting mutual support during filming. However, critical reception of Perkins's performance was largely negative upon the film's release.

During this period, Perkins was offered a role in the 1959 film Some Like It Hot, which would later star Marilyn Monroe, Tony Curtis, and Jack Lemmon. Perkins was considered for the role of Shell Oil Junior. The film involved the lead characters disguising themselves in women's clothing. Paramount executives reportedly declined to allow Perkins to take the role, concerned about the implications of casting a gay actor in drag for an entire film. The role ultimately went to Curtis.

Instead, Paramount offered Perkins the lead in The Matchmaker (1958) opposite Shirley Booth, Shirley MacLaine, Paul Ford, and Robert Morse. The film included a scene in which Perkins and another male character disguise themselves as women to evade detection. To secure his participation, the studio offered Perkins a salary of $75,000 for ten weeks of work, significantly more than MacLaine's reported $25,000 for the same duration. Perkins raised concerns about the pay disparity, but no changes were made to MacLaine's compensation.

Though he defended MacLaine to studio executives, Perkins reportedly had a strained working relationship with her. MacLaine later reflected on the experience, commenting on his guarded demeanor and the difficulty in distinguishing between his public persona and authentic self.

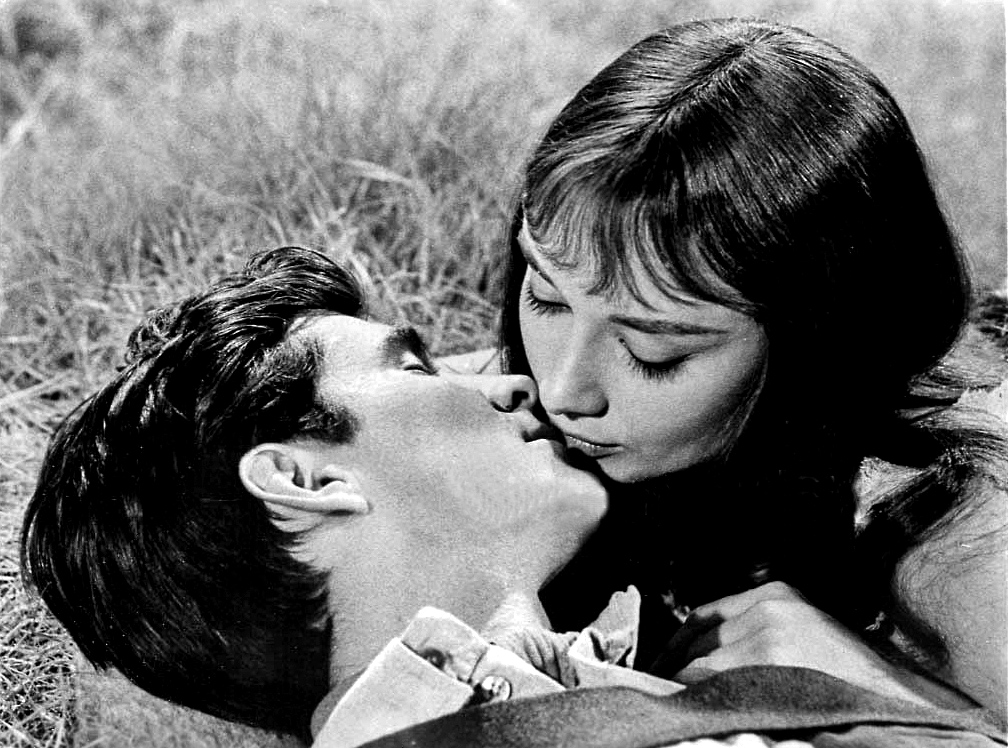
Perkins and Audrey Hepburn in a publicity still for Green Mansions (1959)

Following the loss of the role in Some Like It Hot, Paramount cast Perkins opposite Audrey Hepburn in Green Mansions (1959), positioning the film as a means to promote his leading-man image. The studio emphasized his physicality, featuring scenes in which he appeared shirtless and engaged in physical combat. Perkins also performed the film's title song, "Green Mansions", which briefly charted. Reflecting on the production later in life, Perkins described Hepburn as "wonderful to work with, like a real person, almost a sister".

Perkins next appeared in On the Beach (1959), which was filmed on location in Melbourne over a three-month period. This production was noted for its collaborative environment. Perkins reportedly maintained a positive working relationship with the cast, including assisting Fred Astaire, who was making his dramatic film debut.

In Tall Story (1960), Perkins played a college basketball player opposite Jane Fonda in her screen debut. To prepare for the role, he underwent basketball training. Perkins and Fonda shared a good professional rapport, aided in part by Perkins's previous work with her father Henry Fonda. According to Fonda, Perkins offered her advice on camera performance techniques, including how to position herself effectively within the frame. She credited him with helping her understand how to act for the screen. Fonda later acknowledged both she and director Joshua Logan had developed feelings for Perkins, which led to complications during the production.

=== 1960s ===
==== Troubles with Paramount ====
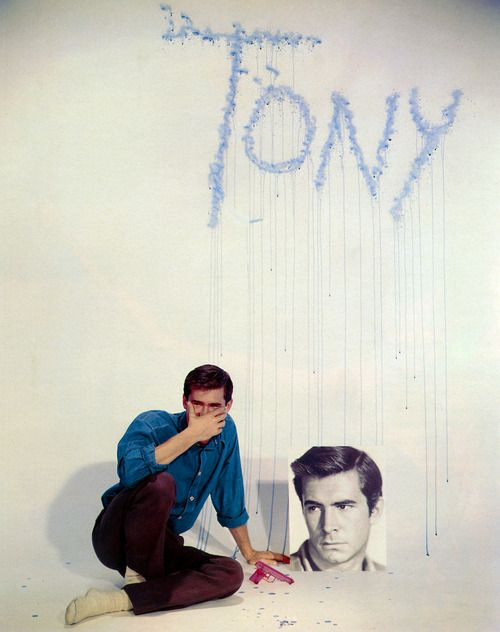
Publicity photos taken in 1959

After signing with Paramount Pictures in 1955, Perkins was cast in a succession of leading roles intended to solidify his image as a romantic and masculine screen presence. By the time he had completed three films for the studio, Paramount had reportedly invested approximately $15 million in his career, prior to the release of any of the films. This significant investment contributed to growing tensions between Perkins and the studio.

Perkins, for his part, expressed dissatisfaction with the direction of his film career. While his contract allowed him to return to the Broadway stage, the majority of his fame stemmed from his film work, where Paramount consistently placed him in conventional leading-man roles. Perkins reportedly sought to be recognized as a serious character actor rather than a teen idol. His resistance to being typecast, particularly in roles that emphasized traditional masculinity, resulted in the loss of certain opportunities, including the roles of Shell Oil Junior in Some Like It Hot and Tony in West Side Story.

Additional tension reportedly arose between Perkins and Paramount president Barney Balaban. According to multiple accounts, Balaban objected to Perkins's homosexuality and his relationship with actor Tab Hunter (who himself had no similar pressure from his studio, Warner Bros.). Perkins was allegedly pressured by the studio to end the relationship and was urged to undergo conversion therapy during his contract period. One associate of Perkins recalled a conversation in which Perkins responded to the studio's demands by affirming his relationship with Hunter.

Sources suggest that Perkins resisted studio pressure until approximately 1959, during the period between filming Tall Story and Psycho. Around this time, efforts by studio executives to distance him from Hunter were reportedly successful. This separation is often cited as a contributing factor in Perkins's decision to buy out the remainder of his contract with Paramount, following a similar move previously made by Hunter at Warner Bros.

==== Psycho and Greenwillow ====
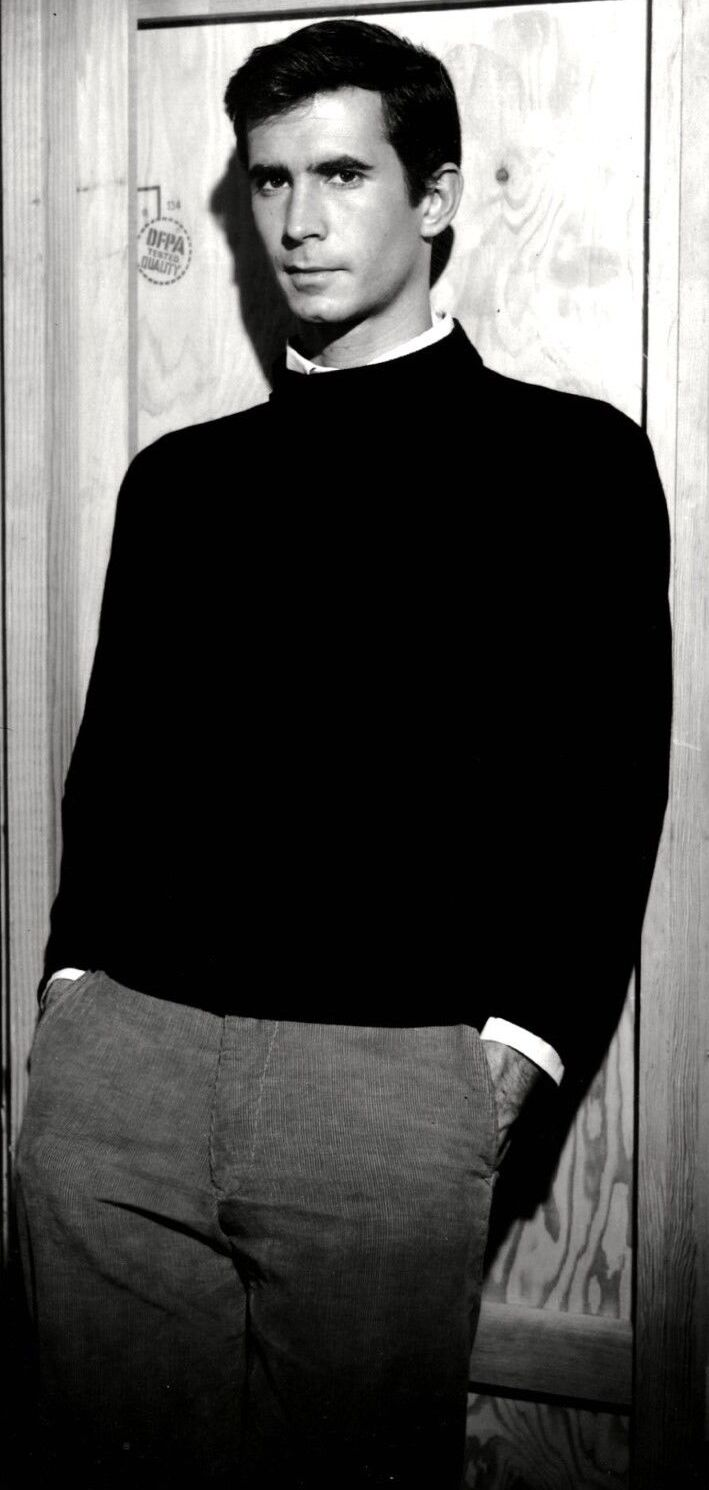
Perkins as Norman Bates in a publicity photo for Psycho (1960)

In 1960, Perkins starred as Norman Bates in Alfred Hitchcock's Psycho. The film was produced on a limited budget, with both Perkins and co-star Janet Leigh accepting reduced salaries. Much of the crew was borrowed from Hitchcock's television series Alfred Hitchcock Presents. In Robert Bloch's source novel, Norman Bates is middle-aged, overweight and unattractive; Hithcock sought to subvert expectations by casting the young, slender and handsome Perkins, who was mostly known for playing wholesome and likable characters. Even though Perkins was deliberately cast against type, the character also echoed his natural quirkiness and the nervous energy he had projected in previous roles.

While filming Psycho, Perkins was also performing in the Broadway musical Greenwillow, composed by Frank Loesser, who reportedly disliked Perkins for being gay. Despite this, Perkins received critical praise for his performance in the show. Director George Roy Hill commented on Perkins's performance, stating that while his voice did not possess the typical qualities of a Broadway vocalist, it was free of the harsher tones often associated with musical theatre, and that his main solo, "Never Will I Marry", showcased his strengths. For his work in Greenwillow, Perkins was nominated for another Tony Award for Best Actor in a Musical.

Upon release, Psycho was a major box-office hit. Perkins's performance received praise from critics, earned him the Best Actor Award from the International Board of Motion Picture Reviewers and brought him international recognition. The character of Norman Bates became closely associated with Perkins and remained a defining role throughout his career; he appeared in three sequels over the ensuing decades.

==== European films ====
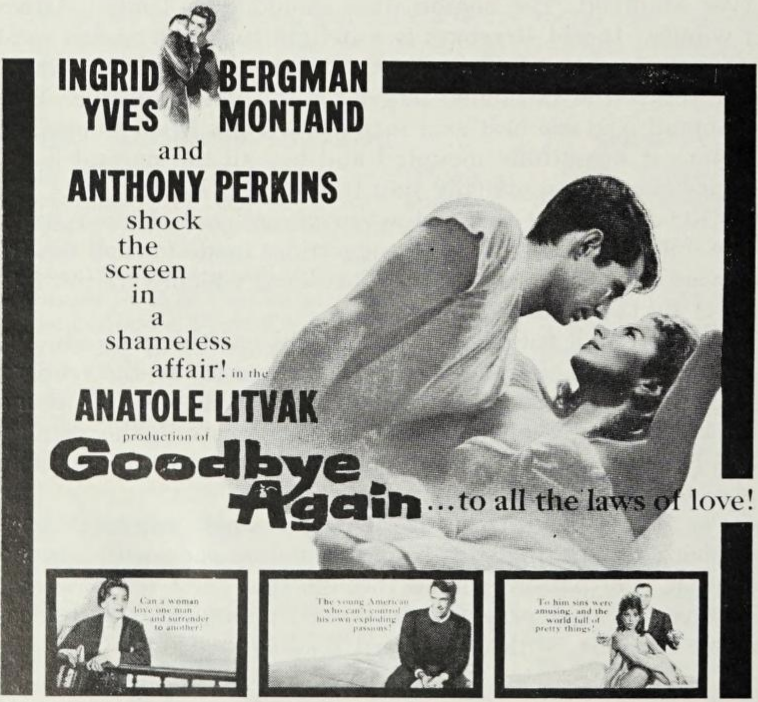
Perkins and Ingrid Bergman in an advertisement for Goodbye Again (1961)

Perkins's status was strengthened by Psycho's success, which made freelancing an interesting option; this led him to buy out his Paramount contract two years before its option point.

Seeking to avoid being typecast as a horror actor and willing to make challenging films, Perkins relocated to France and began working in European cinema. His first film in this period was the drama Goodbye Again (1961), a French-American coproduction co-starring Ingrid Bergman and filmed in Paris. It also marked his return to a romantic role, immediately after Psycho. The film was originally titled Time on Her Hands, but the English-language title Goodbye Again was suggested by Perkins, referencing one of his father's plays. Perkins's performance in the film received critical acclaim and earned him the Cannes Film Festival Award for Best Actor.

Perkins briefly returned to the United States in 1962 to appear in the Broadway play Harold, although the production had a short run. He soon returned to Europe, where he was cast in Phaedra (1962), co-starring Melina Mercouri. The role received favorable reviews. Mercouri later commented on Perkins's enigmatic screen presence, describing him as both attractive and elusive. She stated: "He was the most intelligent and the most beautiful actor that I played with. He was extremely generous [and gorgeous], a gentleman."

Following Phaedra, Perkins starred in Five Miles to Midnight (1962), marking his second collaboration with Sophia Loren. Perkins reportedly agreed to join the project only after Loren was cast in place of Jeanne Moreau. Behind-the-scenes footage from the production was featured in the documentary The World of Sophia Loren, which captured moments of camaraderie between Perkins and Loren, including rehearsals and off-camera interactions. The film achieved moderate commercial success.

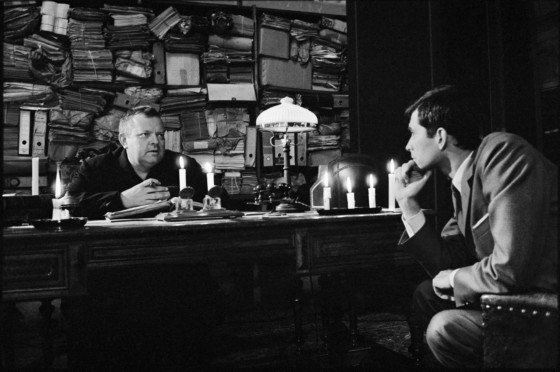
Perkins (right) with Orson Welles acting together in a scene from The Trial (1962)

Perkins continued his work in psychologically complex roles with his performance in Orson Welles's The Trial (1962). Welles personally selected Perkins for the lead role of this adaptation of Franz Kafka's novel, and expressed interest in only proceeding with the film if Perkins agreed to participate. According to Perkins, Welles told him, "if I wasn't going to make it, he wasn't going to make it either".

Although Perkins's tormented character in The Trial drew comparisons to Norman Bates in Psycho, Perkins did not express concern about potential typecasting, particularly given the opportunity to work with Welles. He said about Welles, "He's wonderfully sure of himself and his ability without being dictatorial and autocratic about it ... [H]e isn't inflexible". During production, Perkins maintained a high regard for Welles

Welles later spoke positively of Perkins, acknowledging the critical reception of the actor's performance and taking responsibility for it. He remarked, "Perkins got very bad press, all over the world, and the entire blame for that is mine, because he is a superlative actor and he played the character that I saw as K... I recognize that I did Tony—who is one of the best actors we have—a great disservice". Despite the mixed reception of Perkins's performance, The Trial received favorable reviews internationally and developed a cult following. Welles himself stated shortly after its release, "The Trial is the best film I have ever made". Welles and Perkins later co-starred in Ten Days' Wonder and shared credits in two other films.

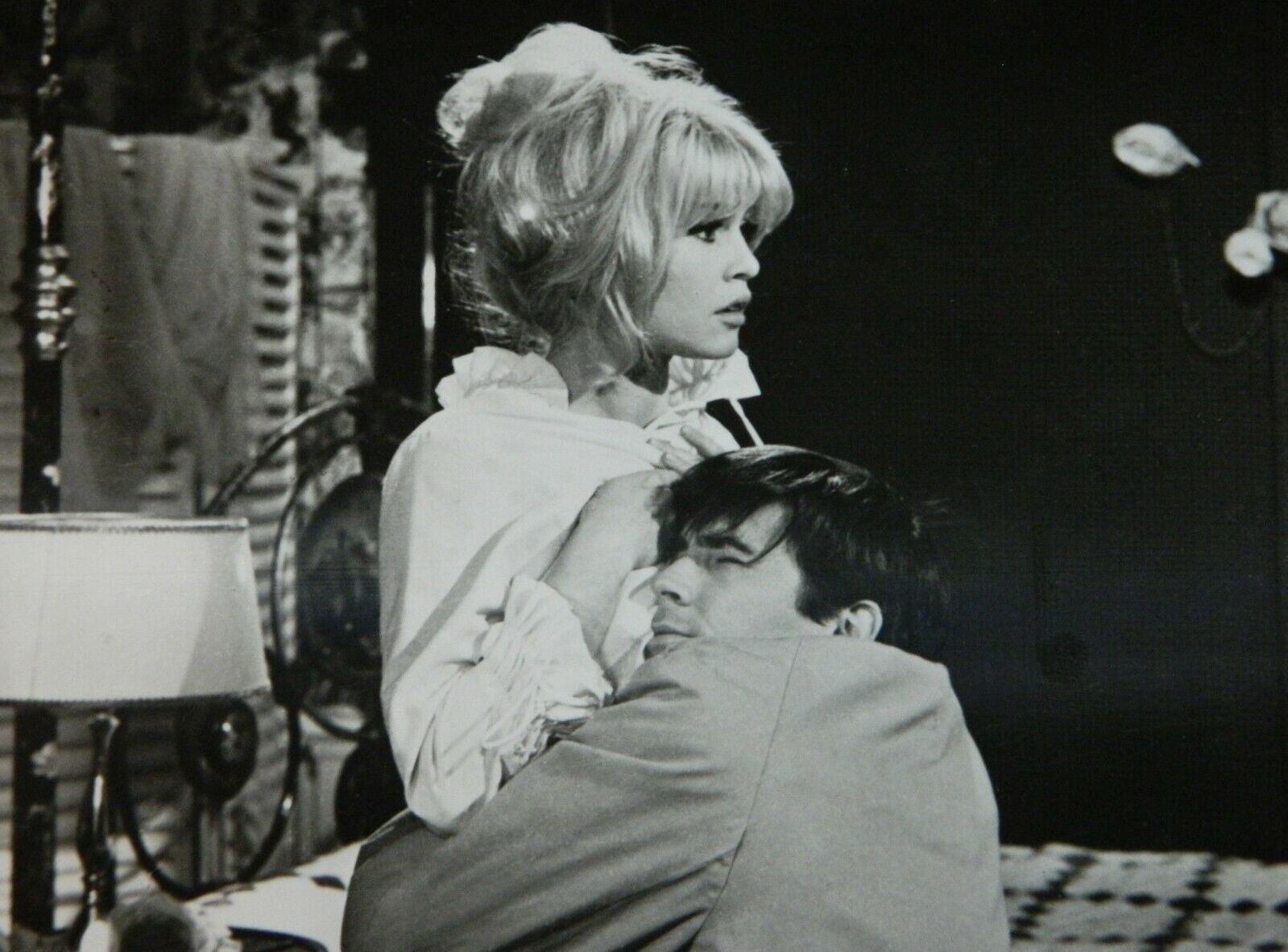
Perkins embracing Brigitte Bardot in a publicity still for The Ravishing Idiot

Perkins's final role portraying a psychologically disturbed character in a romantic film was in Two Are Guilty (1963), filmed in France. The film had limited impact upon release. His subsequent project was the comedy The Ravishing Idiot (1964), co-starring Brigitte Bardot. Perkins became the first American actor to portray a romantic partner opposite Bardot. In later interviews, he mentioned having been uncomfortable during the production and stated that Bardot had been his least favorite co-star.

Following The Ravishing Idiot, Perkins filmed The Fool Killer (1965) in Mexico. While the film received some critical recognition, it was not a major box office success. He then returned to France to appear in the ensemble cast of Is Paris Burning? (1966), directed by René Clément with whom he had already worked in This Angry Age (1957).

==== Return to the United States ====
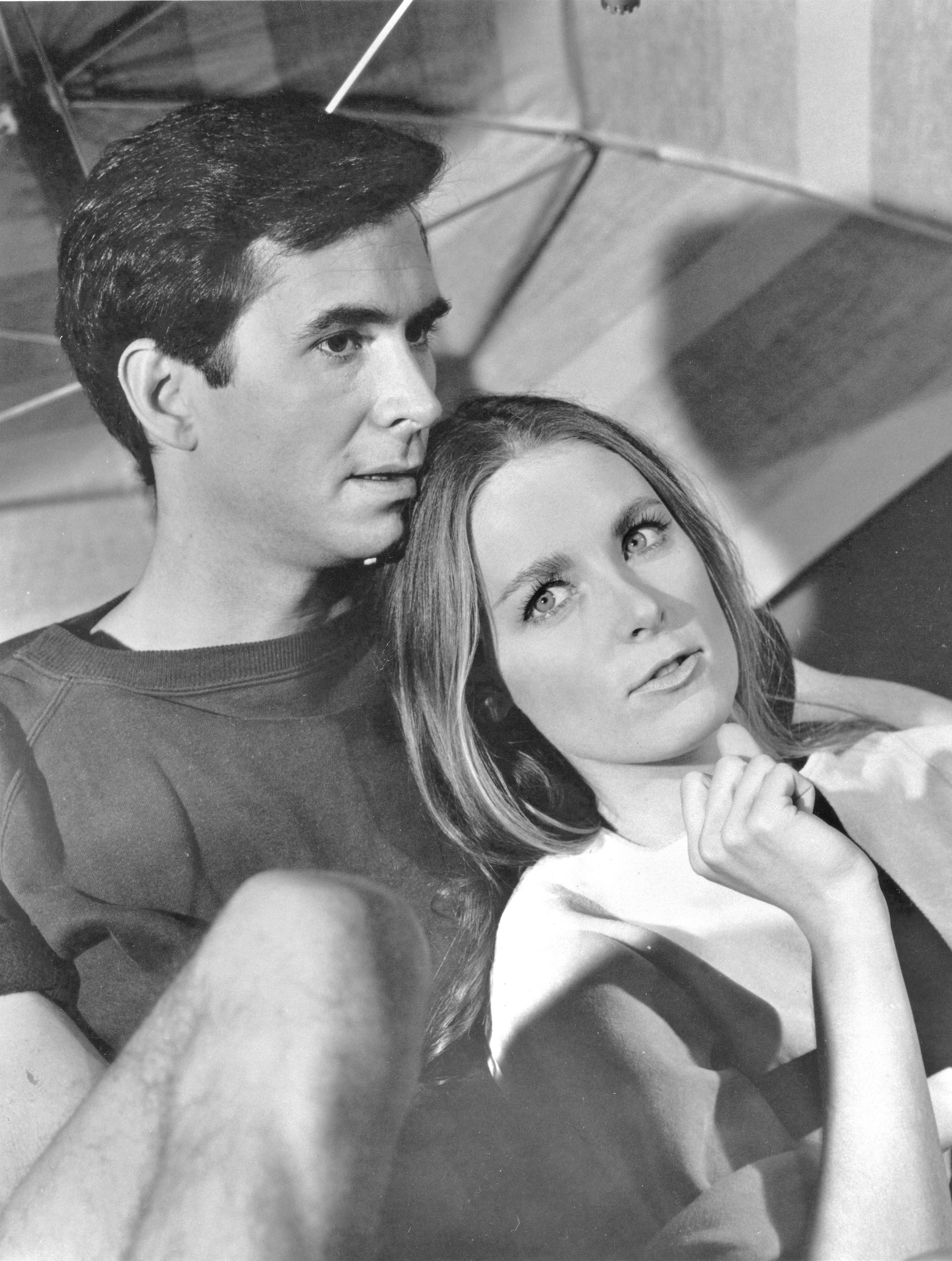
Perkins with Charmian Carr in Evening Primrose, 1966

While still living in France in 1966, Stephen Sondheim composed the musical Evening Primrose for the television series ABC Stage 67, Perkins playing the lead role. Around the same time, he announced Perkins as the original lead for Company, though Perkins ultimately withdrew from that project. Nevertheless, Perkins continued to serve as an artistic inspiration for Sondheim for several years.

Perkins returned to the Broadway stage in The Star-Spangled Girl (1966–67), written by Neil Simon. He played a politically radical roommate competing for the affection of a young woman, a departure from his earlier portrayals of psychologically disturbed characters. His co-stars included Connie Stevens. While the actors were recognized for their performances, the play received mixed reviews overall. Simon later reflected on the work, noting that it lacked the strength of his other comedies and stating, "I knew it never had a chance to be a powerful comedy".

Shortly afterward, Perkins returned to France and starred in Claude Chabrol's The Champagne Murders (1967). Although the film received some critical acclaim, including a favorable review from The New York Times, it did not perform notably at the box office.

In 1968, Perkins made his first Hollywood film since Psycho, starring in Pretty Poison alongside Tuesday Weld. In the film, he played Dennis Pitt, a man on parole from a psychiatric institution. Perkins and Weld had previously dated in the early 1960s, and though their on-set interactions were reportedly cool, they remained professional. While Pretty Poison was not commercially successful at the time of release, it was well received by critics.

=== 1970s ===
==== Shift to supporting roles ====
In the early 1970s, Perkins transitioned into supporting roles in major Hollywood productions, appearing in Catch-22 (1970) and WUSA (1970). That same year, he directed and acted in the Off-Broadway production Steambath.

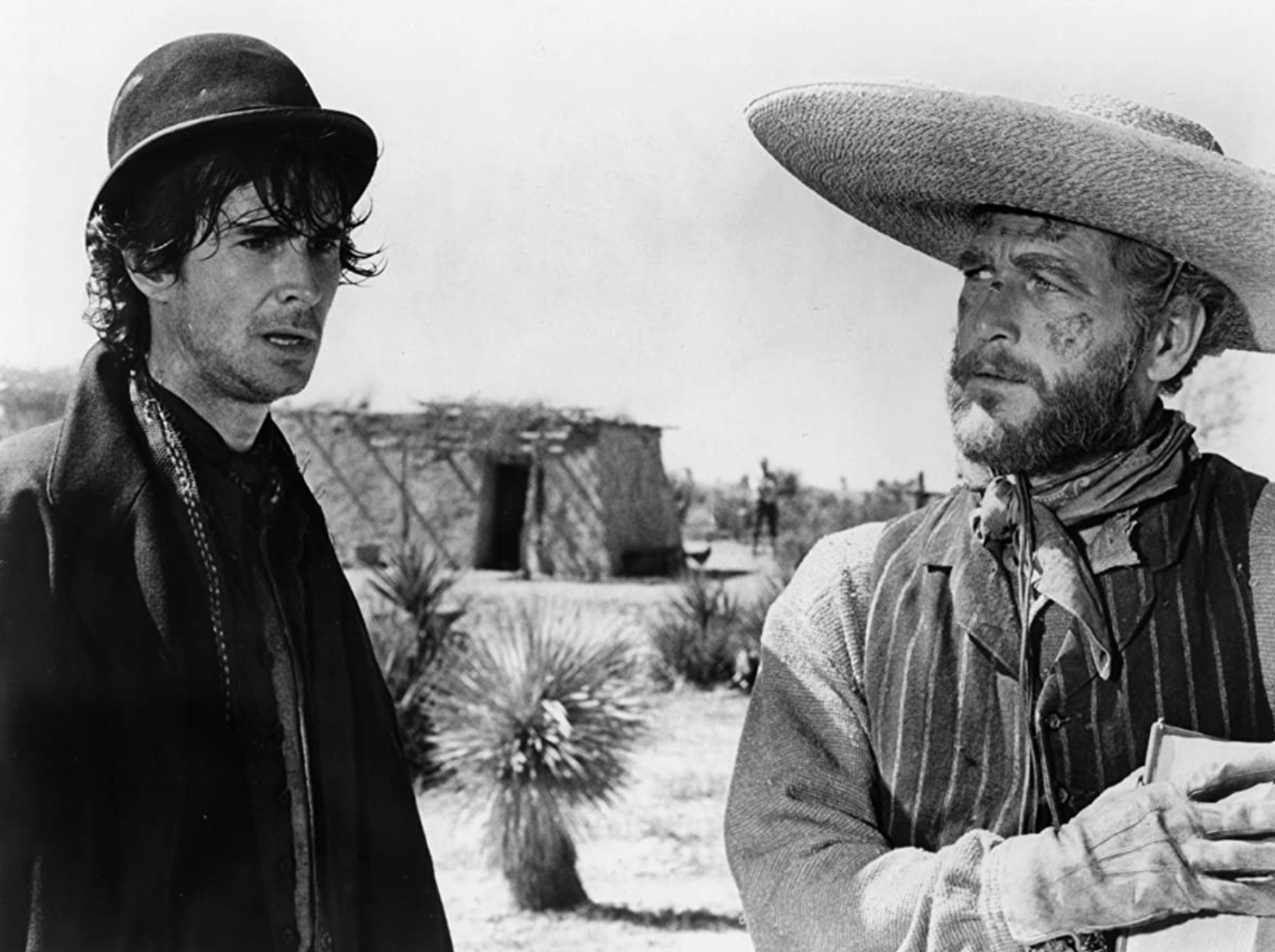
Perkins (left) with Paul Newman (right) in The Life and Times of Judge Roy Bean (1972)

Perkins also starred in the made-for-television thriller How Awful About Allan (1970), again portraying a psychologically unstable character. Though it received little attention upon release, the film later gained a small cult audience after entering the public domain, which increased its accessibility. He next appeared in the French crime drama Someone Behind the Door (1971). Perkins once more played a mentally unstable character, and the film had limited impact.

In 1971, Perkins starred in another French production, the murder mystery Ten Days' Wonder, his second film with Claude Chabrol where he reunited with Orson Welles. The film featured two recurring narrative motifs in Perkins's career: his character suffers from mental troubles, and becomes romantically involved with a stepmother as in Desire Under the Elms (1958) and Phaedra (1962).

Perkins reunited with Tuesday Weld in Play It as It Lays (1972). The Chicago Sun-Times praised the film for its writing, direction, and casting, noting that Weld and Perkins brought emotional depth to their characters. Weld won a Golden Globe for her performance, and both she and Perkins were considered potential contenders for Academy Award nominations, though neither received one. Perkins later referred to his performance in the film as his best.

Later in 1972, Perkins appeared in a supporting role in The Life and Times of Judge Roy Bean, a Western directed by John Huston and starring Paul Newman. Perkins played a traveling minister who aligns himself with Newman's character. The film marked his second appearance with Newman following WUSA, and his only shared credit with his former partner Tab Hunter.

In 1974, Perkins was part of the ensemble cast of Murder on the Orient Express. The film reunited him with former co-stars Ingrid Bergman (Goodbye Again, 1961) and Martin Balsam (Psycho, 1960). It was both a critical and commercial success. That same year, Perkins co-starred with Beau Bridges and Blythe Danner in Lovin' Molly. The film was relatively well received.

Also that year, Perkins assumed the lead role in the Broadway production of Equus, replacing Anthony Hopkins. In this role, he portrayed a psychiatrist, diverging from his previous portrayals of mentally unstable characters. The performance was met with strong critical acclaim. Also in 1974, he directed the Off-Broadway play The Wager, though it had minimal impact.

In 1975, Perkins appeared in Mahogany alongside Diana Ross. The two developed a close friendship during filming. Perkins played a fashion photographer, a role that was rewritten shortly before filming to reflect aspects of his Psycho persona. The character, originally written as explicitly gay, was revised and portrayed with ambiguous, queer-coded traits. Perkins later expressed dissatisfaction with the film, but Mahogany performed well commercially.

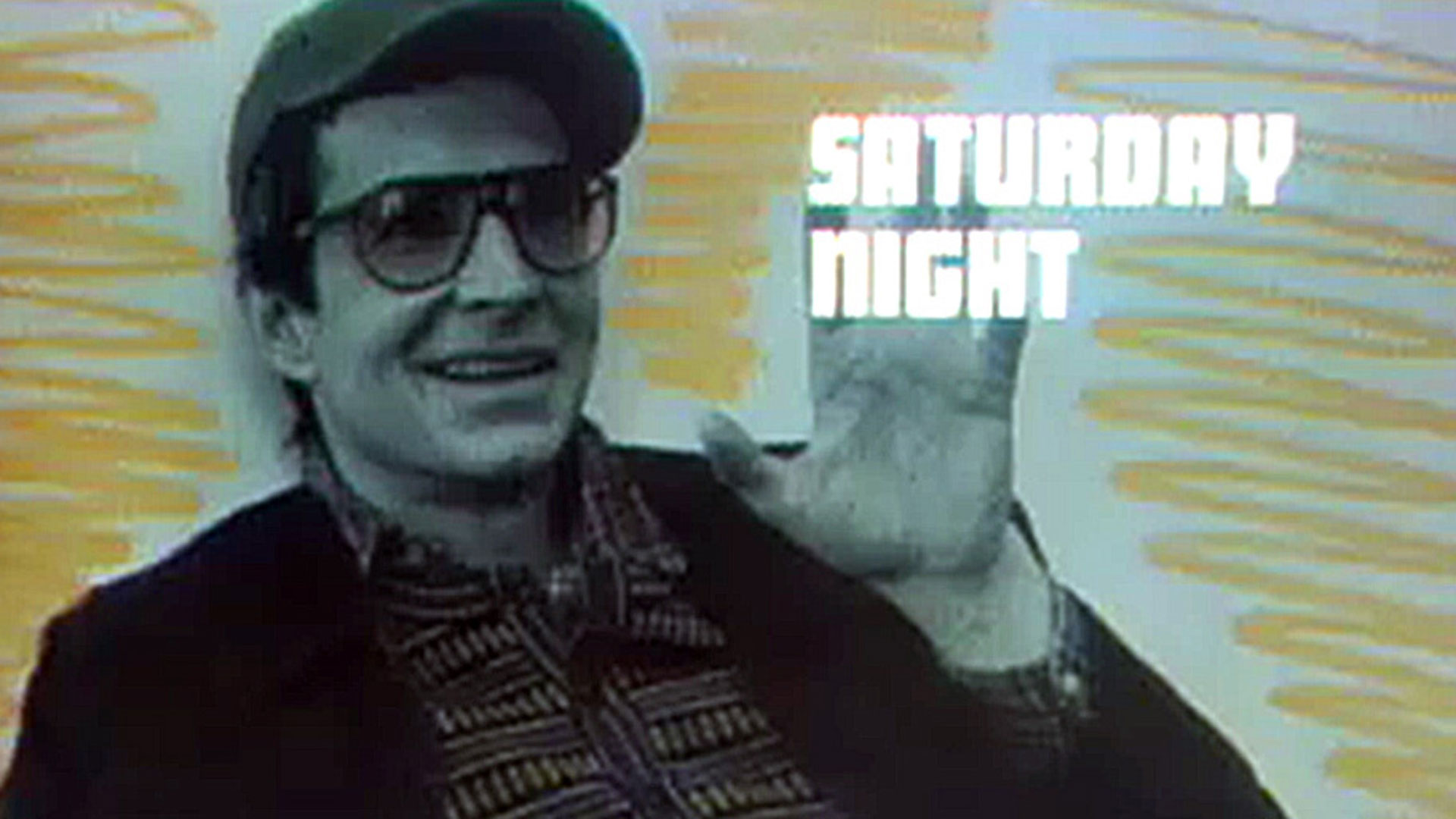
Perkins posing for the intro of his Saturday Night Live episode, 1976

In 1976, Perkins hosted an episode of NBC's Saturday Night. During the episode, he parodied his serious public persona, including a comedic sketch titled "Norman Bates's School for Motel Management", in which he reprised his role from Psycho. In his opening monologue, he thanked the audience for seeing "the real Tony Perkins" and later performed in sketches that included roles such as a singing psychiatrist and characters in various horror-themed segments. He also appeared alongside The Muppets in a segment near the end of the program.

In 1978, Perkins starred in Remember My Name, written and directed by Alan Rudolph, alongside Geraldine Chaplin. Perkins's wife in that film was portrayed by his real-life spouse, Berry Berenson. The film was described by Rudolph as an updated version of classic melodramas from the mid-20th century. It was well received by critics, with the San Francisco Chronicle awarding it four out of five stars and praising the performances of both leads.

That same year, Perkins appeared alongside Mary Tyler Moore in First, You Cry, a made-for-television drama based on journalist Betty Rollin's autobiography about her experience with breast cancer. The film received multiple award nominations, including a Golden Globe and several Primetime Emmy nominations.

Also in 1978, Perkins played Javert in a television adaptation of Les Misérables. In 1979, he appeared in the science fiction film The Black Hole. During production, Perkins reunited with crew members from Fear Strikes Out, which had been released more than two decades earlier. Later that year, he returned to the stage with a lead role in Romantic Comedy, a Broadway play that ran for 396 performances and received favorable reviews. Also in 1979, Perkins appeared in a villainous role in the satirical thriller Winter Kills.

==== Sondheim-Perkins writing collaborations ====
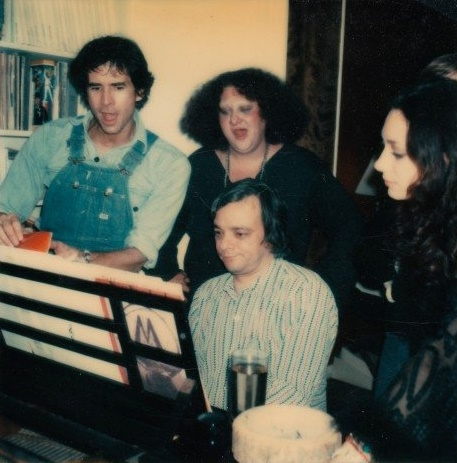
Perkins (left) with Pat Ast (center), Marisa Berenson (right) and Stephen Sondheim (seated), 1973

In 1973, Perkins reunited with Stephen Sondheim to co-write the mystery The Last of Sheila; their screenplay was produced into a film directed by Herbert Ross. The story was inspired by games that Perkins and Sondheim had invented and follows a movie producer who invites a group of wealthy acquaintances on a yacht in an attempt to uncover which of them is responsible for his wife's death. Each guest is assigned a secret based on real-life gossip, forming the basis of a mystery narrative. Some of the characters were modeled after individuals known to Perkins and Sondheim. Perkins did not appear in the film; he was encouraged to play the character Clinton —an idea supported by Sondheim— but he declined as he felt the role was too similar to some of his previous parts. The role eventually went to James Coburn.

The film was a commercial success and earned them the Edgar Allan Poe Award for Best Motion Picture Screenplay. Director Rian Johnson later cited it as an influence for his own film Knives Out and its sequel Glass Onion.

A further project by Perkins and Sondheim was The Chorus Girl Murder Case, announced in 1975. Perkins described it as a mixture of Bob Hope wartime comedies, Lady of Burlesque, and elements from Orson Welles's magic shows, structured around a mystery plot similar to The Last of Sheila. Other influences included They Got Me Covered, The Ipcress File, and Cloak and Dagger. The project had initially sold in October 1974, with Michael Bennett at one point attached to direct and Tommy Tune considered for the lead. Although the script was reportedly completed by November 1979, the film was never produced.

In the 1980s, Perkins and Sondheim began a new project titled Crime and Variations, a seven-part television series developed for Motown Productions. A 75-page treatment was submitted in October 1984. The story was set in New York's socialite world and involved a crime-based puzzle. A separate writer was expected to develop the screenplay. This project also remained unproduced.

=== 1980s and 1990s ===
In 1980, Perkins appeared in the action film North Sea Hijack. He then co-starred in the Canadian thriller Deadly Companion. The film received limited attention, though Perkins's performance was noted positively in a few reviews.

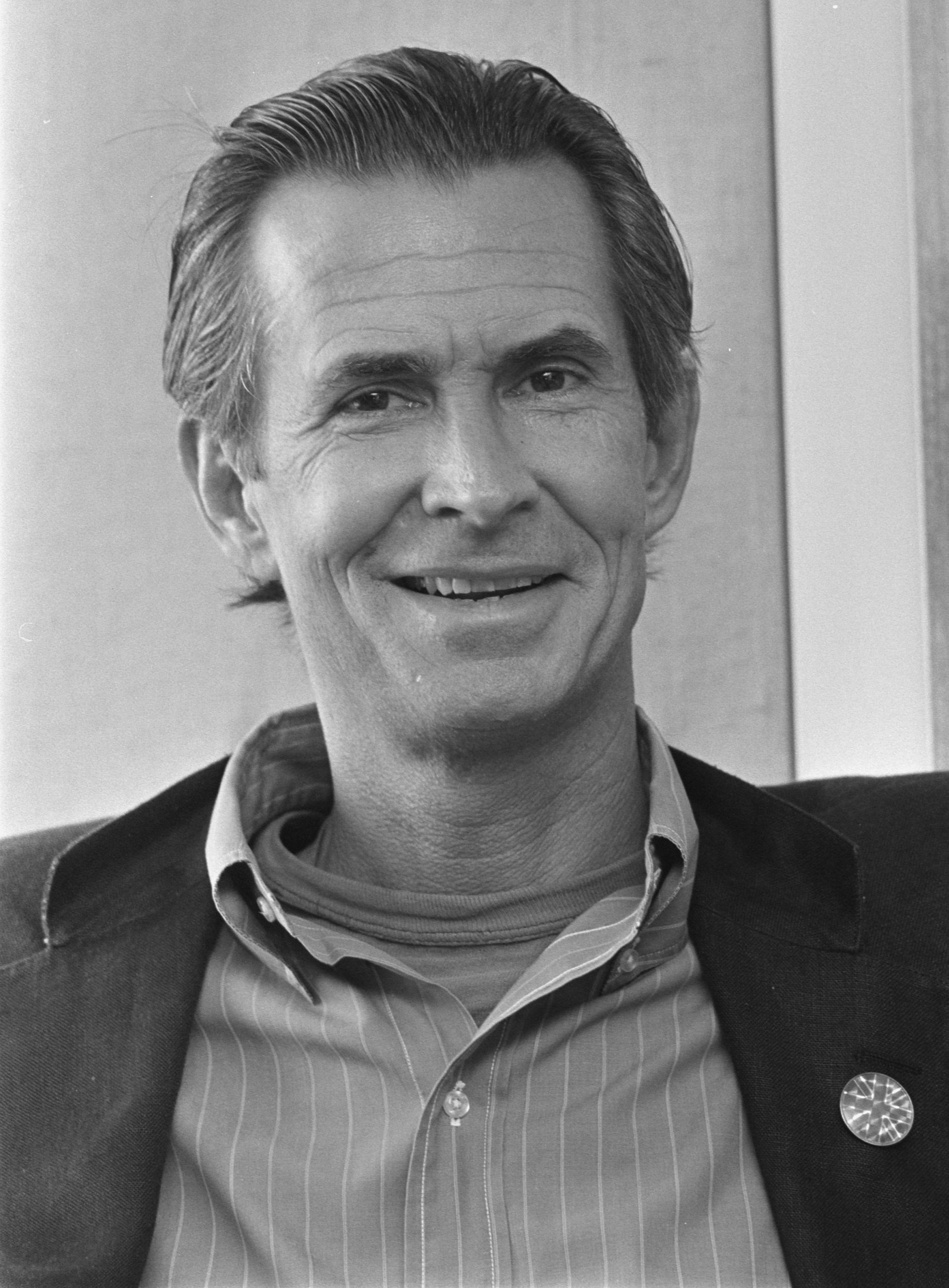
Perkins in 1983

Perkins reprised his role as Norman Bates in Psycho II (1983), which was a commercial success. Shortly thereafter, Perkins traveled to Australia to star in the mini-series For the Term of his Natural Life (1983), which received strong viewership ratings.

In 1984, Perkins appeared in The Glory Boys, a British television thriller mini-series co-starring Rod Steiger. According to reports, tensions arose on set between the two actors. Perkins next appeared as a deranged antagonist opposite Kathleen Turner, in Ken Russell's Crimes of Passion (1984), a film he felt was compromised in the editing process but that later developed a cult status.

Perkins then reprised the Norman Bates character again in Psycho III (1986), which was also his first film as a director. Perkins said he chose to direct the film due to his appreciation of the script, on which he commented: "I felt this would be a good script for an unknowing director to take on because the scenes were so well written, they directed themselves." Prior to filming, he stated: "It's a question of affinity with the material. And I know this story. I should. I've lived with it-and sometimes tried to live it down-for more than 20 years". His performance in that film earned him a Saturn Award nomination for Best Actor. Despite the recognition, that second sequel to Psycho was less successful than its predecessors, which led to bouts of diminished self-confidence for Perkins.

Following Psycho III, Perkins returned to television with a guest-starring role in the mini-series Napoleon and Josephine: A Love Story (1987). In 1988, Perkins received praise for his role in the horror film Destroyer, which was otherwise deemed a disappointment. That same year, Perkins made his second and last film as a director, the dark comedy Lucky Stiff, in which he did not appear. While not commercially successful upon release, the film later gained a minor cult following.

Perkins continued to work in the horror genre with appearances in Edge of Sanity (1989), Daughter of Darkness (1990), and I'm Dangerous Tonight (1990). He filmed a pilot for a dark comedy television sitcom titled The Ghost Writer, in which he played a horror novelist receiving unearthly visits from the ghost of his deceased wife. Perkins saw this project as a potential transition into more comedic roles. However, the pilot was not picked up for series development.

He returned once more to the role of Norman Bates in Psycho IV: The Beginning (1990), a made-for-cable film. During its production, Perkins learned he was HIV-positive. Between 1990 and 1992, he appeared in six television productions, including Daughter of Darkness and the horror anthology series Chillers (1990), which he hosted. His final performance was in In the Deep Woods (1992), released after his death. These late-career roles continued to reflect his association with the horror genre.

=== Missed roles ===
Perkins auditioned for the lead roles in East of Eden and Rebel Without a Cause, both of which were awarded to James Dean. Rumors suggested that Perkins's loss of the East of Eden role led director Elia Kazan to cast him as Tom Lee in the Broadway production of Tea and Sympathy, but Kazan publicly denied this. Perkins was later cast in Friendly Persuasion over Dean and, following Dean's demise, replaced him in This Angry Age.

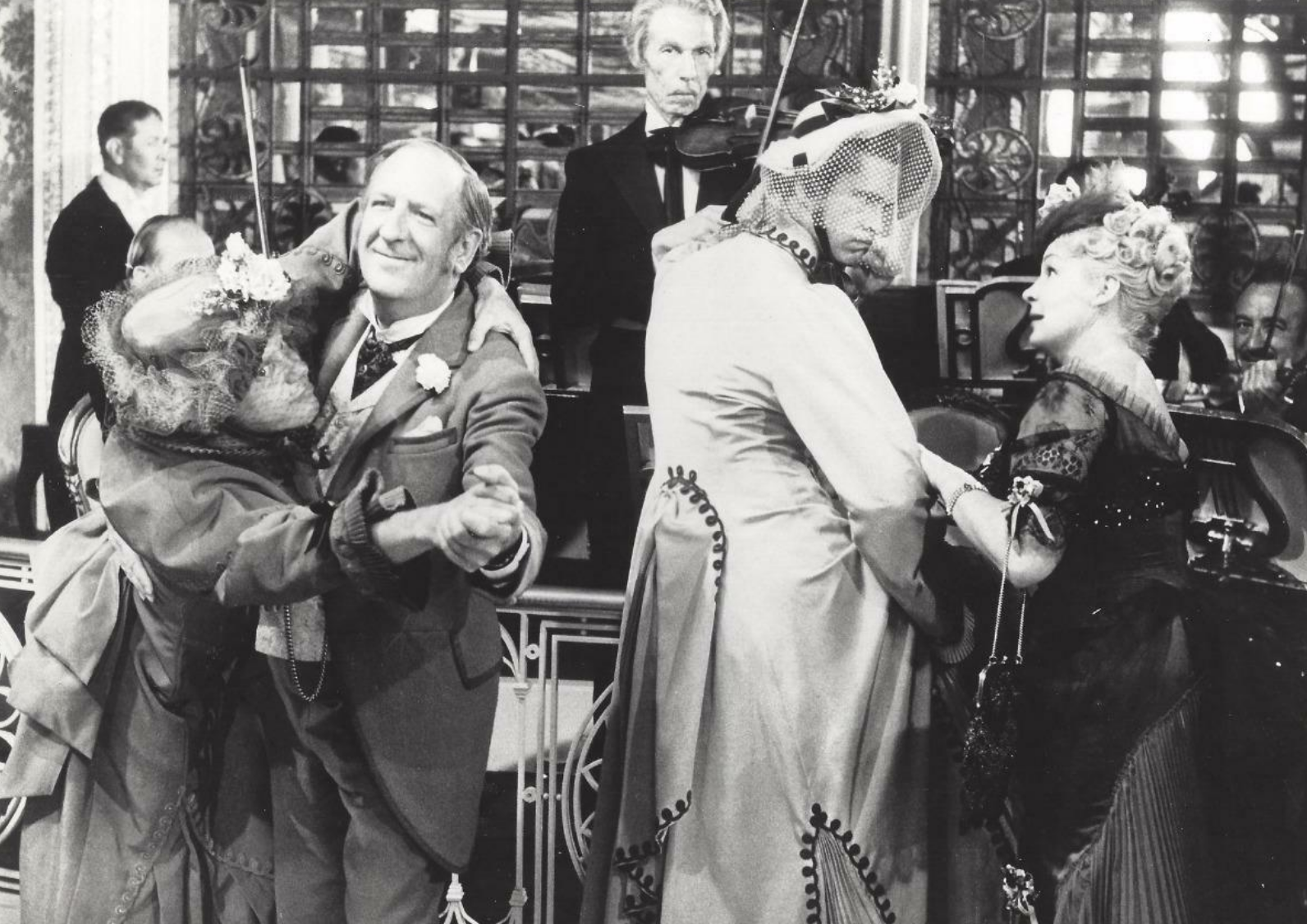
Perkins (wearing veil) in drag for The Matchmaker (1958), despite the fact that Paramount had just forbidden him from doing Some Like It Hot for its flamboyancy

Perkins was offered the lead in the film adaptation of Harold Robbins's A Stone for Danny Fisher, but declined the part. The project was ultimately reworked into King Creole, a musical starring Elvis Presley, with whom Perkins was occasionally compared. He was also offered the role of Shell Oil Jr. in the 1959 film Some Like It Hot. Perkins declined the role under pressure from Paramount executives, who reportedly objected to him appearing in drag.

Around the time he signed on to Psycho, Perkins was considered for the lead in Dooley, a biographical film written by Robert Anderson. Directors George Roy Hill and Joshua Logan were interested in the project, but Paramount did not approve the production costs, and Perkins was not permitted to audition.

Perkins was seriously considered for the role of Tony in the 1961 film adaptation of West Side Story, but was again prevented from auditioning by Paramount. Despite not participating in the project, this led to his friendship with lyricist Stephen Sondheim.

Perkins was the original choice of both Tennessee Williams and director Tony Richardson for the lead role in the 1963 Broadway revival of The Milk Train Doesn't Stop Here Anymore, opposite Tallulah Bankhead. Due to a scheduling conflict, Perkins was unable to take the role, and Tab Hunter was cast instead.

He was also cast as Robert, the lead role in Stephen Sondheim's musical Company, but declined the part, citing scheduling conflicts and later attributing his decision to anxiety over the long performance commitment. Some commentators also speculated that his decision was influenced by perceptions of the character's queer-coded traits.

In the early 1990s, Perkins agreed to voice the character of Dr. Wolfe, a dentist, in The Simpsons episode "Last Exit to Springfield". He died before the role could be recorded, and the part was ultimately voiced by Simpsons regular Hank Azaria.

== Artistry ==
=== Influences ===
Perkins, having grown up in New York as the son of a theater performer, was heavily influenced by stage actors in the early years of his interest in acting. Slowly, however, his influences shifted, especially with the new wave of Method actors on the big screen. In 1958, Perkins told Holiday magazine that the single performance that influenced him most was Marlon Brando's in On the Waterfront: "That's the direction I want to go as an actor. To convey the maximum with the simplest, barest means." He also mentioned James Dean later on: "Well, I was certainly impressed with the originality of [Dean's] talent. Of course, it was popular at the time of his emergence."

Perkins was a lifelong member of the Actors Studio, an institution both Brando and Dean attended as well, which could have contributed to his interest in the Method. Perkins's posthumous biographer, Charles Winecoff, though, dismisses any ideas that Perkins was a Method actor: "Young Perkins fell somewhere in between the mannered style of his father's era and the new, seemingly organic style exemplified by Brando and Dean."

Especially in his early years, Perkins took advice from a host of his costars, a majority of whom were experienced and revered actors in their own right. The most influential of his fellow stars were Gary Cooper and Henry Fonda.

=== Acting style ===
Despite his many celebrated performances, Perkins never discussed the method with which he acted. Many said he was somewhere between his father's style of acting (building a character from the outside in) and the Method technique (building a character from the inside out). Recalling how he prepared for his mental breakdown scene in Fear Strikes Out, actress Norma Moore said he was especially "serious, very intent, very nervous before shooting ... pacing, not talking to anybody, shaking his hands." The film's director, Robert Mulligan, said that Perkins was "riding on instinct, very giving and very trusting and very brave." A year later, when Perkins played Eugene Gant for Broadway in Look Homeward, Angel, not much had changed. "His approach was a purely pragmatic one," friend George Roy Hill remembered, "he had no theories to get in his way."

There is evidence to suggest that Perkins used previous (sometimes traumatic) experiences to drive his performance. During his debut run on Broadway in Tea and Sympathy, Perkins was allegedly drafted into the army, which he dodged by admitting he was a homosexual. This backfired, leading to harsh mistreatment at the hands of the Selective Service that reportedly scarred him so much he wouldn't speak about it. His boyfriend was there when he returned home, listening to him crying and whimpering. He later said that Perkins incorporated the same whimpering into his performance as Tom Lee in Sympathy. Perkins, though, never hinted at this in a rare mention of his technique when speaking about the scene in Friendly Persuasion when Josh Birdwell decides to enlist:

"That scene started [filming at] about 9:30 in the morning and by 1 o'clock the unions at that time declared that we had to go to lunch, right in the middle of the scene—just before my close-up. And [William Wyler, the director] came to me and said, 'I'm really sorry about this. You're doing a fabulous job and I want you to hold onto this if you possibly can. Why don't you go back to your room and sort of concentrate and reread the script? I'm very very sorry; we'll start again in an hour.' Well, I went to the commissary and had two cheeseburgers and a malted and came back and sat down and started over again. I didn't have the self-consciousness as an actor to find that that would be a difficult thing to do, so since I didn't think it was gonna be difficult, it wasn't ... Well, youth can do anything."

Many of Perkins's films distinguished him as a talented actor of the day, garnering numerous awards and nominations. Turner Classic Movies summarized: "A masterful character actor, Perkins's ability to convey mental instability in a fashion that was simultaneously disturbing, affecting, and darkly humorous made him a unique and valuable talent."

== Public image ==
=== Early persona ===
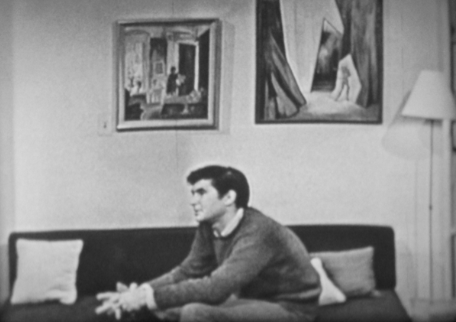
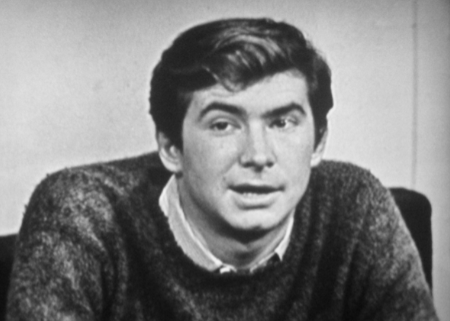
Perkins displaying his trademark body language in a 1957 episode of Person to Person

In the early part of his career, Perkins often played shy, sensitive young men. His characters were conceived as both wholesome and unusual, exhibiting an endearing and sometimes quirky awkwardness. "He was supposed to be gawky, you know," costar Jean Simmons recalled, "with the sleeves too short and all that stuff." Former partner Tab Hunter spoke similarly about Perkins: "Beneath the boyishness [...], there was a lot of tension—not news to anyone who's seen Tony on-screen. The familiar body language wasn't an act. He slouched around with his hands shoved deep in his pockets, and he jiggled his foot unconsciously—a nervous twitch."

Despite his well-documented habits, the authenticity of them has been challenged by some of Perkins's friends and colleagues. Alan Sues, who worked with Perkins on Tea and Sympathy, noted, "You know, if you play that kind of sensitive, I-don't-know-if-I-can-get-through-this sort of thing, people come to you. His approach was that he was suffering, that stuff was going on inside of him, and I don't think it was. His strong suit was knowing how to project an image." Although Hunter expressed similar doubts ("I began to wonder how much of his sheepish appeal was genuine," he wrote in 2005, "and how much was manufactured, used to mask very calculated, methodical intentions"), he did believe overall that Perkins was dealing with a lot of backlash from Paramount over his sexuality, which therefore led him to become as brooding as he was.

However real or fake the mannerisms were, they caught on in the press, which had a field day when Perkins, who didn't know how to drive, was photographed hitchhiking to the set of Friendly Persuasion. He was often described as "boyish" by fan magazines, and his odd habits, from the way he dressed to the meals he ate, were written about in detail. Photoplay called Perkins a "barefoot boy with cheek" in a 1957 issue, while later portraying him as an embarrassed singer when they photographed him during recording sessions. Perkins seemingly played into this quirky yet insecure persona, venting to McCall's:

"I'm not really suited to be a movie star. I have no confidence in myself. I'm not interested in money. I'm not good-looking. I have a hunch in my spine. I can't see worth a damn. I have a very small head. I haven't many opinions. I dislike nightclubs—the kind of things that give you easy publicity. I have no string of French girls. I'm not tough. I can't put on a show in public. I'm much too sensitive for Hollywood. I'm an easy target."

He also did so on game shows. As a mystery guest on the popular television program What's My Line?, in the Australian accent he had used during his most recent film, On the Beach, Perkins responded to a question asking if he was a movie star by saying "The term movie star implies a certain glamour which I believe I lack."

Prominent gossip columnists Louella Parsons and Hedda Hopper were fans of Perkins. [Hopper] was the biggest Tony Perkins fan in town," Tab Hunter recalled. "She practically declared him her adopted son in print and was eager to publish anything that would bury those rumors about Tony's 'secret friend' [a euphemism for Hunter and their secret relationship often employed by the press]." His mannerisms also endeared him to Academy Award-winning costume designer Dorothy Jeakins, with whom he worked on Friendly Persuasion and Green Mansions.

=== 1950s sex symbol ===
While under contract with Paramount, Perkins was heavily promoted by the studio not only as a teen idol but also as a sex symbol, something Perkins saw as a sacrifice to more serious prospects. They cast him in a succession of romantic lead roles, whether they were beside relative unknowns such as Norma Moore and Elaine Aiken or major stars such as Sophia Loren and Audrey Hepburn. Although he was briefly depicted in drag in The Matchmaker with Shirley MacLaine, Perkins's image in these films was consistently romantic and meant to be attractive to women. Despite his 140-pound stature, Perkins delivered a shirtless performance in both Desire Under the Elms and Green Mansions. This ended up being detrimental to Perkins's career, costing him the leads in both the 1959 film Some Like It Hot and the 1961 film West Side Story.

Perkins's early popularity was increased by the plentiful stories circulating in fan magazines about his purported dating life. Perkins was frequently reported as "losing his heart" to a woman or to be "infatuated" with his female co-stars, whether they were married or not. Soon, Perkins's dating life became as prominent in the media as his career, something that deeply irritated him.

Perkins's singing career in the late 1950s was consistent with teen idol status; many of his songs centered around romantic themes.

=== Post-Psycho ===
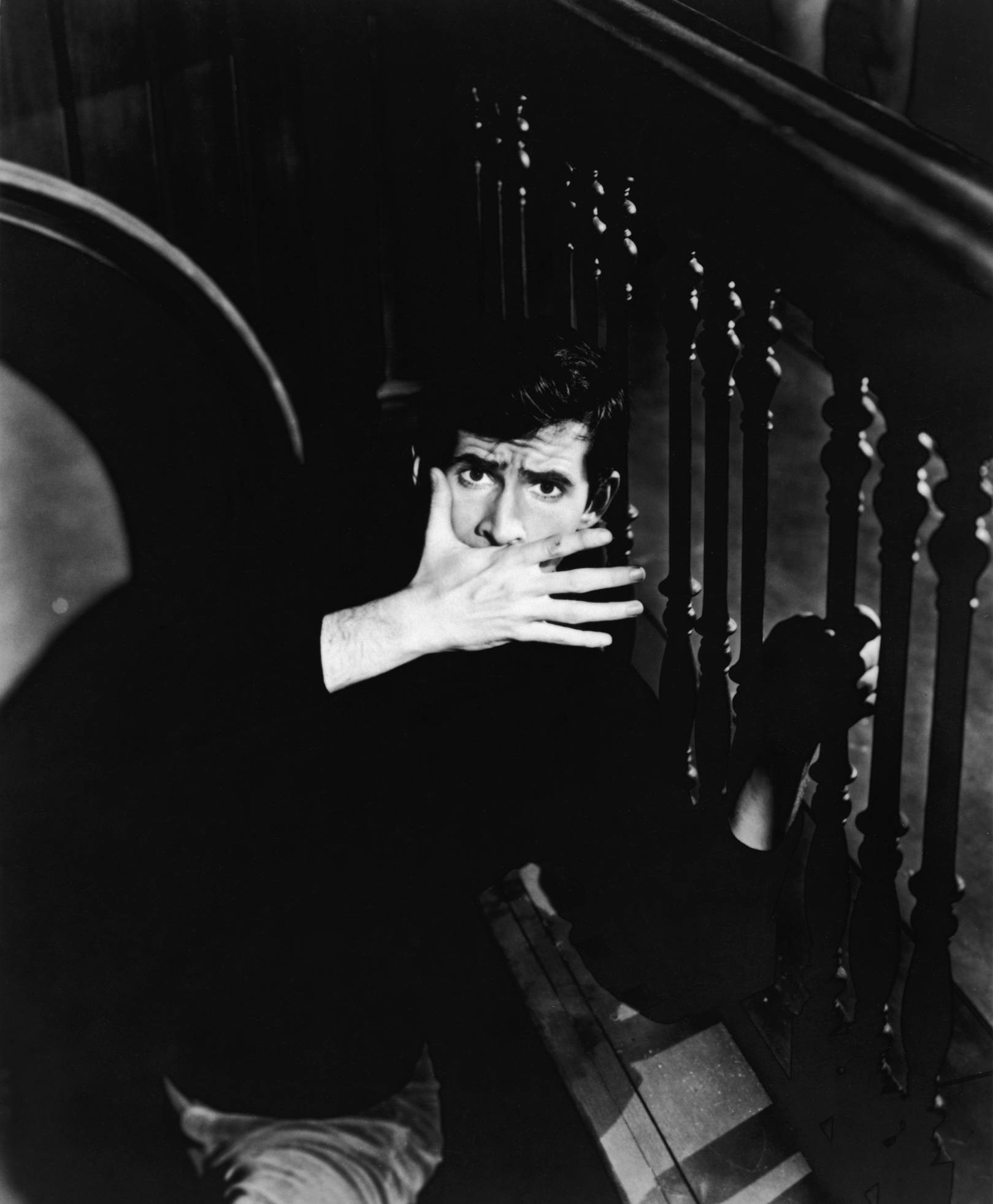
Publicity still for Psycho.

Following his performance as Norman Bates in Psycho, Perkins's public image changed markedly as he became permanently associated with that role in the public's eye. He gradually stopped playing wholesome, sensitive roles and instead found himself increasingly typecast as dark, eerie or maniacal characters, which overshadowed the versatility he had shown in his earlier comedic and dramatic roles. Perkins acknowledged that whereas he had started out as a "a light, sophisticated comedy actor", Psycho had changed the public's perception of him. Later in his career, he came to be seen as a "horror icon". His roles in the 1980s included the insane, lecherous clergyman in Crimes of Passion and Dr Jekyll/Mr Hyde/Jack the Ripper in Edge of Sanity. Commenting on Perkins's numerous performances in unsettling or sinister roles, a review in the Los Angeles Times stated "Anthony Perkins’ films aren't just dark. They're inky black... To know [his characters] is to loathe them."

During the last decade of his career, Perkins appeared in an increasing number of genre pictures; his son Osgood later commented that his father became relegated to making "bad horror movies".

Despite this typecasting, Perkins embraced his association with Psycho and the Norman Bates role, which he reprised in several sequels. During the production of Psycho III, he said: " It doesn't worry me at all that people identify me with the role. It is my role. But one of the reasons I went on a worldwide tour to promote 'Psycho 2' was to give people the chance to see the difference between the nuts I play on the screen and the real me. I have played quite a few psychologically disturbed people and I never forget that a lot of people have grown up with me as Norman Bates.' He stated in 1990: "I think 'Psycho' is one of the things that's given me longevity in this business. But of course it's also kept me from roles. You know I would have hated to disappear like so many actors in the '50s did. In a way, it's a challenge to overcome something like that. I'm still here. That's all I know".

== Personal life ==
=== Sexuality ===
Speculation about Perkins's sexuality began early in his career, particularly after his Broadway debut in Tea and Sympathy in which he portrayed a gay character.

Perkins had his first heterosexual experience at the age of 39 with actress Victoria Principal while filming The Life and Times of Judge Roy Bean in 1971, as confirmed by Principal herself. At the time, he was undergoing conversion therapy with psychologist Mildred Newman. In his 2021 biography of director Mike Nichols, Mark Harris wrote that both Perkins and his longtime partner Grover Dale pursued conversion therapy with the belief that their homosexuality was an obstacle to personal happiness. Harris notes that while Newman and her partner and colleague Bernard Berkowitz were not conversion therapists, they promoted the view that homosexuality was a form of arrested development.

In a 1999 documentary on Perkins, director Sidney Lumet recounted a conversation in which Perkins openly identified as homosexual and that Perkins told him he had moved past that phase (of uncertainty, seemingly) in his life. Accounts from friends, colleagues, and partners have generally characterized Perkins as homosexual rather than bisexual, citing his history of same-sex relationships and limited romantic involvement with women prior to his marriage.

Some contemporaries, including his former partner Tab Hunter, suggested that Perkins maintained a carefully constructed public persona. Hunter remarked that Perkins often presented himself in a particular way and that this self-presentation may have diverged from his private identity, adding: "I don't know for sure what [Perkins] was really like."

In 1983, at the time of Psycho II's release, Perkins granted an interview to People where he discussed his sexuality, disclosing that he had not had sex with a woman until his thirties and that the thought had previously "terrified" him. He mentioned that several of his female co-stars, including Ava Gardner, Jane Fonda, Ingrid Bergman, and Brigitte Bardot, had expressed romantic or sexual interest for him, which he had been too frightened to pursue. He stated: "I had wild fantasies, but my erotic experience was mostly solitary. Along the way I'd had homosexual encounters, but that kind of sex always felt unreal to me and unsatisfying." In that interview, Perkins also mentioned being sexually abused by his mother and suggested that this may have influenced his perceptions of women.

In a 2024 interview with People, Perkins's son Osgood Perkins described growing up with the awareness that his father was a closeted "gay or bisexual man", reflecting on how a lifestyle and identity "different from the mainstream" might have led to Anthony Perkins's need to lead a double life. He stated that their mother, Berry Berenson, shielded him and his brother from this aspect of their father's identity, considering it unsuitable for children. Osgood Perkins indicated that while the topic was treated as off-limits during their upbringing, he does not resent his mother's approach. He also said that this family dynamic helped inspire his film Longlegs.

==== Therapy with Mildred Newman ====
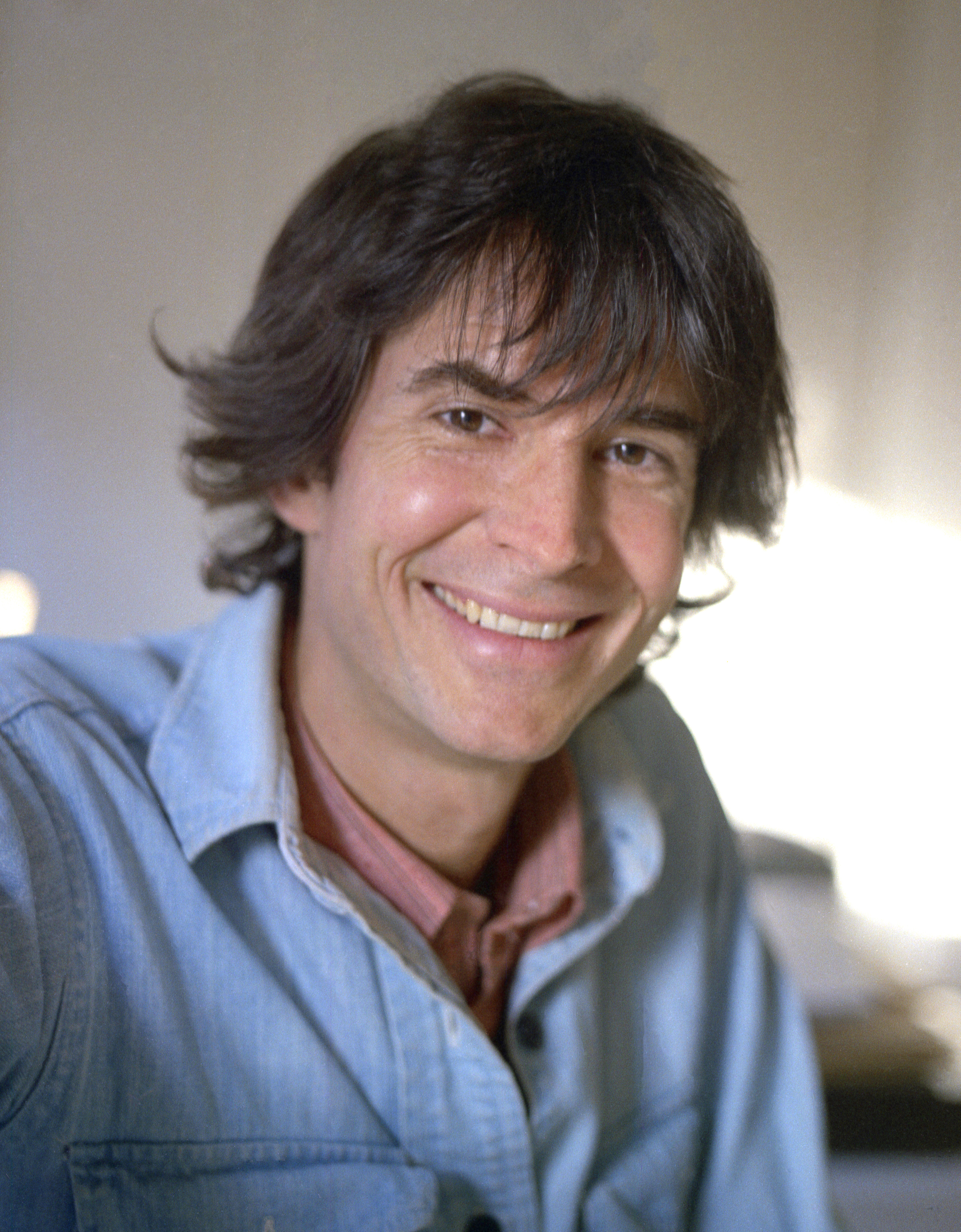
Perkins in 1975

In 1971, Perkins ended a seven-year relationship with dancer Grover Dale. Following the breakup, he sought support from friends Paula Prentiss and Richard Benjamin, who recommended that he consult psychologist Mildred Newman. At the time, Newman had gained public attention with her self-help book How to Be Your Own Best Friend, which was becoming a bestseller. Perkins was also motivated to seek therapy by insecurities about his own acting talent, which he felt had begun to wane. He began meeting with Newman up to three times a week and occasionally participated in group sessions. He later became one of her most prominent celebrity advocates.

According to biographer Charles Winecoff, Newman's therapeutic approach, centered on the idea of self-acceptance and pursuing personal happiness and success, had a noticeable impact on Perkins. In How to Be Your Own Best Friend, Newman had written that while analysts previously believed changing homosexual orientation was unlikely, some had persisted and found that individuals who truly wanted to change had "a very good chance" of doing so.

Perkins later described Newman as a peaceful person and "a crusader for a wider road, for choice and limitlessness" and credited her with restoring confidence in his acting abilities. However, accounts of their sessions suggest a more complex dynamic. Perkins described emotional reactions during therapy, including crying during exercises in which Newman asked him to imagine heterosexual encounters. He also recalled disagreements over her focus on his relationships with women, stating, "She was constantly provoking me about women... We had heated disagreements, knockdown arguments".

Following Perkins's death, his friend Stephen Sondheim publicly criticized Newman's therapeutic methods, describing her as "completely unethical and a danger to humanity."

=== Relationships ===
According to the posthumous biography Split Image by Charles Winecoff, Perkins had exclusively same-sex relationships until his late 30s. These included relationships with Tab Hunter, Christopher Makos, Grover Dale, and French songwriter Patrick Loiseau.

==== Relationship with Tab Hunter, 1955–1959 ====
Tab Hunter acknowledged his relationship with Perkins in his 2005 autobiography Tab Hunter Confidential: The Making of a Movie Star. According to Hunter, the two met at the Chateau Marmont in 1956 during the filming of Friendly Persuasion. Their relationship lasted four years and included a number of shared experiences, such as a stay in a private villa in Rome in March 1957 and a joint appearance on Jukebox Jury that May.

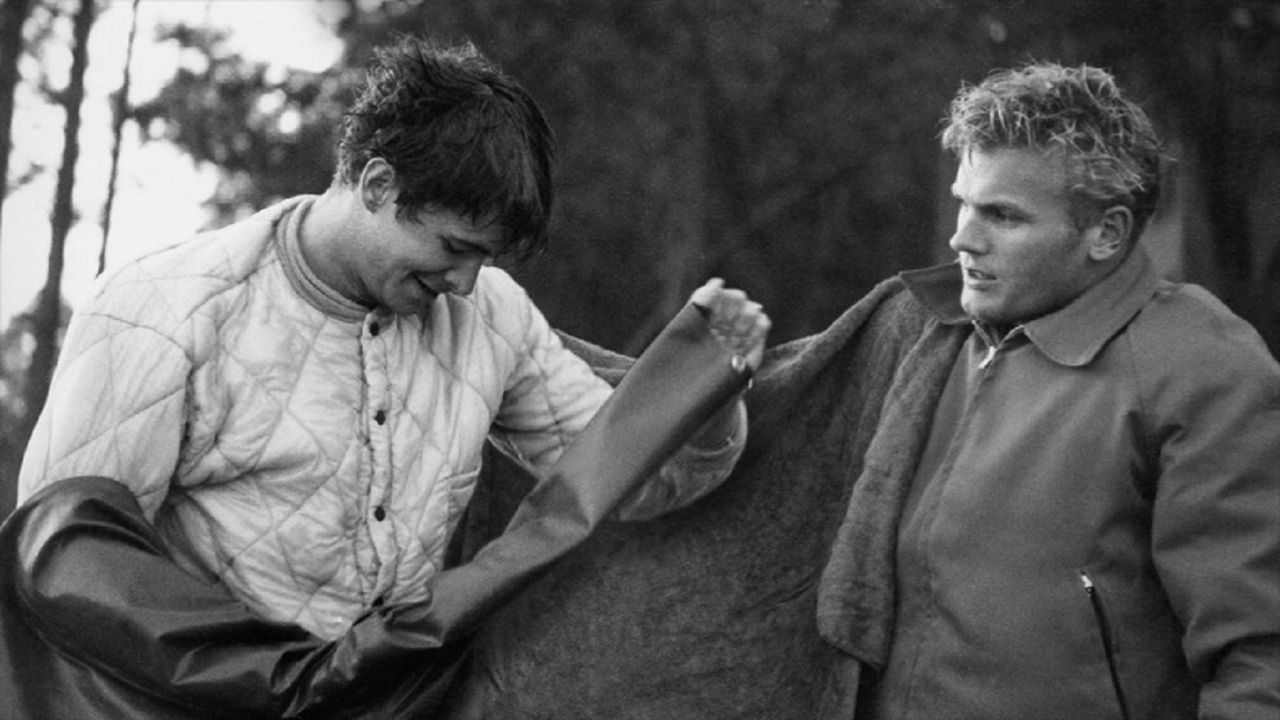
Perkins (left) and Tab Hunter (right) with whom he had a relationship; photo circa 1956 at Lake Arrowhead

Early in their relationship, Perkins informed Hunter that he had been cast by Paramount Pictures in Fear Strikes Out, a role Hunter had previously portrayed on television and had hoped to reprise in a film adaptation. Despite the personal and professional disappointment, Hunter stated that their relationship continued privately as their schedules allowed.

According to Hunter, Paramount Pictures expressed concern over their relationship and its potential impact on Perkins's public image, reportedly leading to tension between Perkins and studio executives. Hunter recalled that these pressures did not immediately affect their personal relationship, which he later described as "a wonderful time in my life". However, the relationship ended in 1959, shortly before the production of Psycho, and the two had limited contact afterward

In 1971, after not seeing each other for almost a decade, they were reunited on the set of The Life and Times of Judge Roy Bean. According to Hunter's recollection, this happened while Perkins was ending his relationship with dancer Grover Dale and had begun conversion therapy with Mildred Newman. The last time they saw each other was in 1982, when Hunter visited Perkins to discuss a potential role for Perkins in the Western parody film Lust in the Dust. Hunter later recalled that he had intended to contact Perkins shortly before his death in 1992 but learned of his passing as he reached for the phone. In later interviews, including for The Advocate and the 2015 documentary Tab Hunter Confidential, Hunter reflected on the significance of their relationship, describing Perkins as "a special part of my journey" and noting the contrast in their personalities and ambitions.

==== Relationship with Grover Dale, 1964–1971 ====
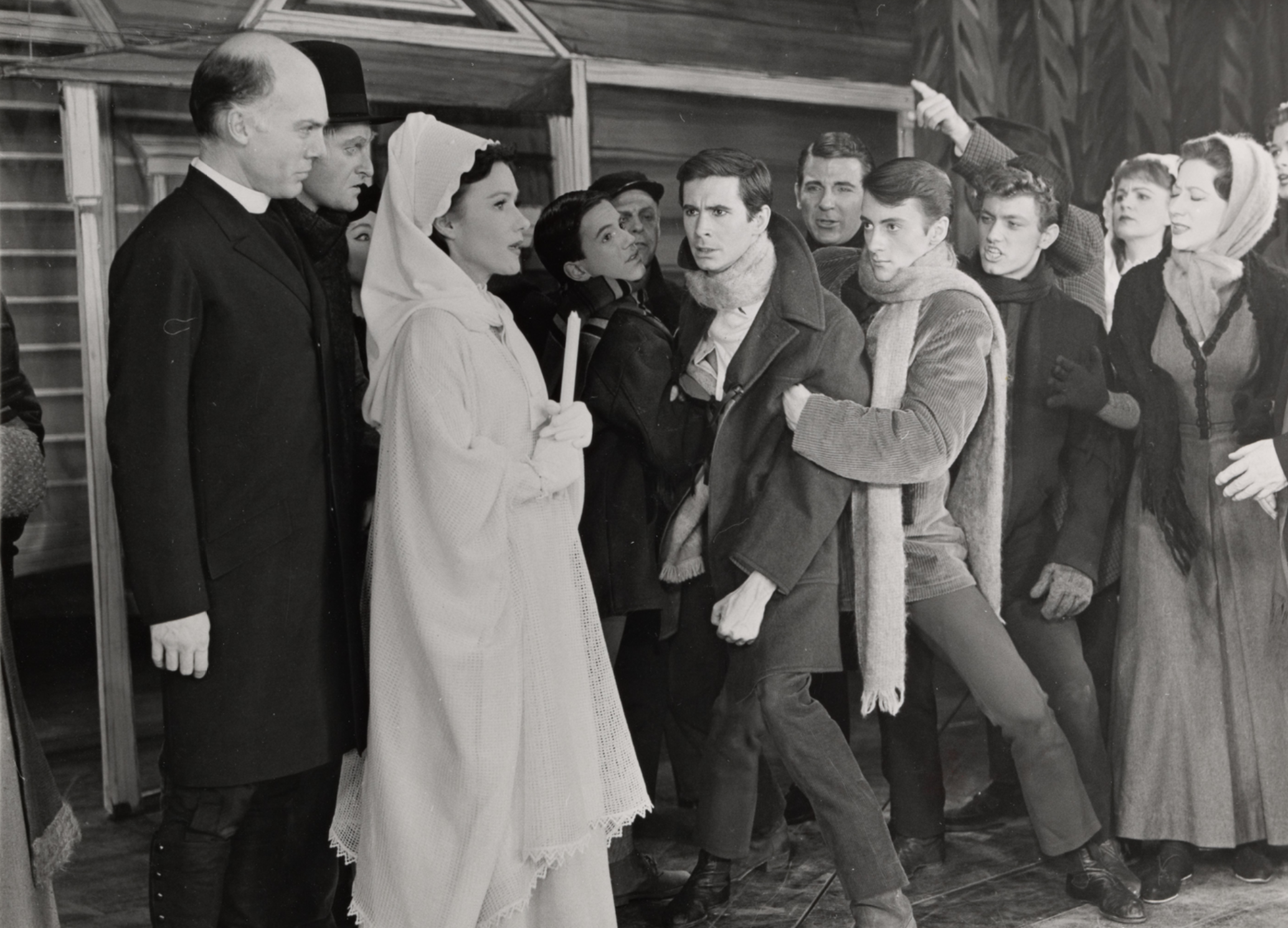
Perkins (center) with lover Grover Dale clinging to his arm in Greenwillow (1960)

Perkins and Grover Dale met during rehearsals for the Frank Loesser musical Greenwillow, in which Perkins played the lead role and Dale served as an ensemble member, dancer, and Perkins's understudy. Their relationship began during the production. According to several people involved in the production, their relationship was discreet but generally known among colleagues.

According to biographer Charles Winecoff, the two did not live together initially, though Dale has said he moved into Perkins's apartment a few months after their relationship began. At the time, this apartment was Perkins's only U.S. residence.

By the late 1960s, Winecoff described Dale as Perkins's primary partner and noted that the two were frequently seen together in New York City. Dale confirmed that they were still in a relationship in 1966. They were a socially active couple, hosting gatherings attended by figures such as Jerome Robbins and Elaine Stritch. Biographical accounts, including Winecoff's, at times characterized their relationship in marital terms. Music producer Ben Bagley recalled Perkins performing a song in a manner that he interpreted as directed toward Dale. Photographer Christopher Makos, a former lover of Perkins, described the relationship as a close bond between "two adult men who probably loved each other very much".

By 1969, at the onset of the modern LGBTQ movement in the United States, Perkins and Dale were regarded by some as role models among gay professionals seeking more open relationships. Dale is often cited as one of the significant relationships in Perkins's life.

==== Marriage ====
There are varying accounts regarding how Perkins met his future wife, photographer and model Berinthia "Berry" Berenson, in 1972. Some sources state that they were introduced at a party in Manhattan, while others claim their first meeting occurred on the set of the film Play It as It Lays. Coincidentally, when asked during a therapy session with Mildred Newman which type of woman he found attractive, Perkins had pointed to a photo of Berenson in Vogue; Berenson had a teenage crush on Perkins after seeing him in Phaedra.

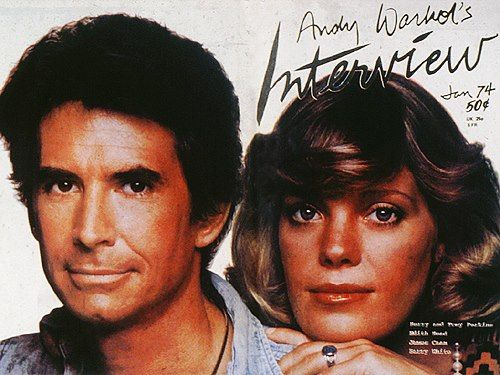
Perkins and Berry Berenson on the January 1974 cover of Andy Warhol's Interview magazine

Although not yet initially romantically involved, Perkins and Berenson spent considerable time together during the early 1970s, despite Berenson being engaged to artist Richard Bernstein at the time. Over time, their relationship developed into a romantic and sexual partnership. According to Bernstein's account, when Berenson informed him of the change in her feelings, he responded by asserting that Perkins was gay and did not share her romantic interest. Berenson reportedly replied that Perkins was seeing therapist Mildred Newman and expressed a desire to live as a heterosexual. She ended her engagement to Bernstein that same day.

Perkins and Berenson married on August 9, 1973. At the time, Perkins was 41 years old and Berenson was 25 and three months pregnant. Their first son, actor and director Osgood Perkins, was born in 1974, followed by their second son, musician Elvis Perkins, in 1976. Perkins said, in 1990: "“Ever since I got married and had kids, my life became much more structured and ordinary. Much more calm. Not nearly so grasping and ambitious. Not so paranoid. Not so fearful". An occasional actress, Berenson appeared alongside her husband in Remember My Name (1978).

The marriage came as a surprise to many in Perkins's social and professional circles. Actress Venetia Stevenson, a close friend of Perkins, later commented that she was shocked by the news, recalling that Perkins had been widely perceived as gay. Berenson herself acknowledged that others were skeptical about the union, stating that she was unaware of the implications at the time, despite Perkins having informed her of his sexuality. Nevertheless, the couple remained married until Perkins's death in 1992. Berenson died during the 2001 September 11 attacks when American Airlines Flight 11, on which she was a passenger, was hijacked and crashed into the North Tower of the World Trade Center.

=== Friendships ===
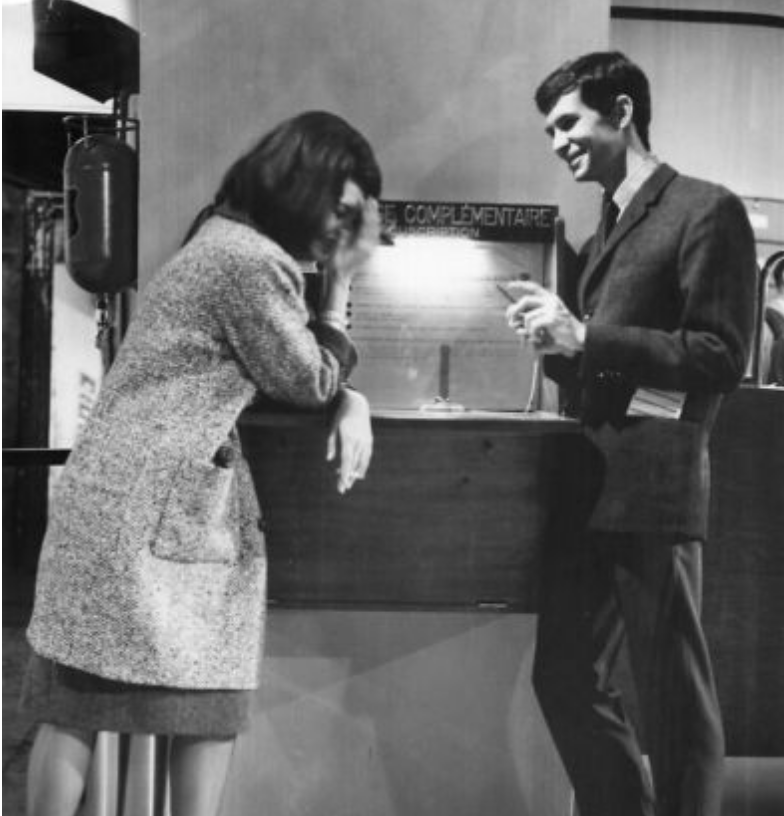
Perkins with Sophia Loren on the set of Five Miles to Midnight, 1961

Throughout his career in Hollywood, Perkins worked with numerous well-known figures, many of whom later spoke positively about him. His relationships with co-stars were often marked by mutual respect and fondness. Sophia Loren, who worked with Perkins on Desire Under the Elms (1958), was frequently photographed smiling with him during a later reunion in Europe.

Actress Elaine Aiken later recalled social outings with Perkins during the filming of The Lonely Man.

Venetia Stevenson described a close friendship with Perkins, saying he often confided in her and stayed over at her home, which was located near the residences of both Perkins and Tab Hunter. Stevenson emphasized the platonic nature of their relationship, attributing their bond to the kind of closeness that can exist between a woman and a gay man.

Perkins also maintained strong friendships with male colleagues. On the set of Psycho, he developed a collaborative relationship with director Alfred Hitchcock, who accepted many of Perkins's creative suggestions for the character of Norman Bates. Even after Perkins relocated to France, he remained a regular guest at Hitchcock's dinners. During production of The Trial, Perkins and director Orson Welles developed a very good working relationship and a genuine sympathy for each other. Perkins even considered writing a book about the director. He carried a tape recorder in his coat for weeks but ultimately abandoned the project out of concern that it might offend Welles. Welles later expressed disappointment that Perkins did not follow through, stating, "Oh, why didn't you [do it]? Why didn't you? I would have loved it!"

Among his most well-known friendships was that with Stephen Sondheim. Perkins and Sondheim briefly lived together and collaborated professionally, most notably on the 1973 film The Last of Sheila, which they co-wrote. Sondheim later recalled that Perkins shared his sensibilities and that working together on the screenplay was particularly enjoyable. Although Perkins was reportedly offered leading roles in several of Sondheim's musicals, he declined due to scheduling conflicts. Sondheim went on to become the godfather to both of Perkins's children and was present at his final birthday celebration.

=== Character and interests ===
Perkins was often remembered by colleagues and acquaintances as a shy and introspective individual with a charismatic presence. Writer Bruce Jay Friedman, who later worked with Perkins on the production Steambath, described him as "enormously charming" and "very controlled", noting that Perkins often appeared to be processing multiple thoughts simultaneously. Mary Tyler Moore, who co-starred with him in the television movie First, You Cry, similarly described him as charming and dedicated to his craft, contrasting her expectation of a sophisticated persona with the more grounded individual she encountered.

Former partner Tab Hunter echoed these sentiments, while also acknowledging Perkins's complexity. He characterized Perkins as somewhat guarded and elusive, suggesting that Perkins selectively revealed aspects of himself to others. Despite this, Hunter described Perkins as humorous, intelligent, and deeply private, noting that he had few close confidants and maintained an enigmatic presence even among friends.

Perkins's reserved nature was evident in his preference for solitary pursuits. From an early age, he was an avid reader with a particular interest in science fiction. This interest in reading paralleled a lifelong engagement with writing. While attending the Browne & Nichols School, he served as co-literary editor of the student newspaper The Spectator. His interest in writing culminated in the co-authorship of the screenplay for The Last of Sheila with Stephen Sondheim, his only screenwriting credit. Reflecting on the experience, Perkins once remarked that acting came naturally to him, while writing was more challenging and required sustained effort.

Despite his introversion, Perkins enjoyed social and recreational activities. He was an avid Scrabble player and frequently played the game with friends, including early romantic partners. He was also a fan of The Ed Sullivan Show, on which he eventually appeared. Perkins's enthusiasm for games extended to appearances on television game shows such as What's My Line? and Password.

Tab Hunter recalled various leisure activities the two shared, including receiving a deluxe ping-pong table from Perkins as a Christmas gift and playing matches together. While Perkins did not have a strong interest in athletics, he occasionally joined Hunter at horse shows or on trips to Lake Arrowhead, preferring activities that highlighted his intellectual and comedic sensibilities.

=== Political views ===
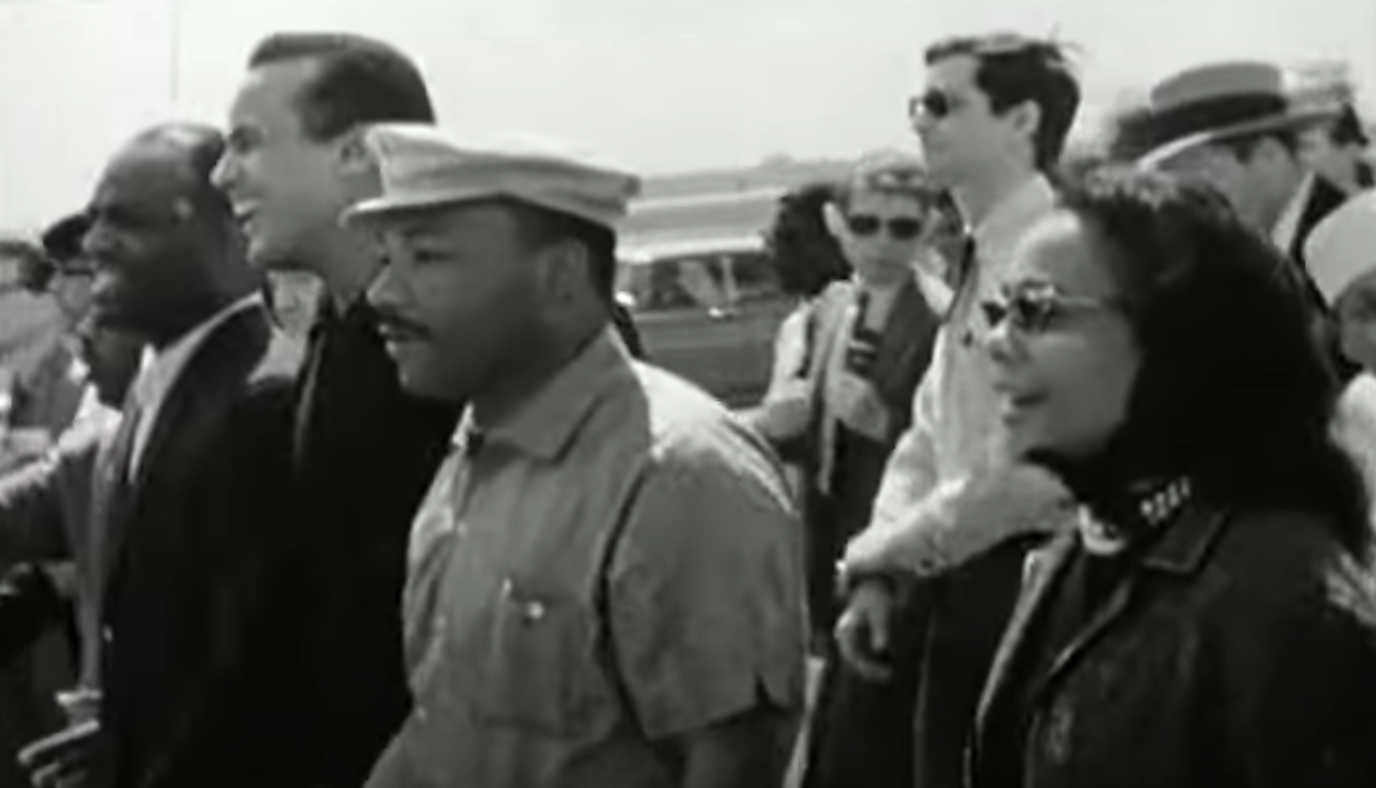
Perkins (back, far right) with Harry Belafonte (far left), Martin Luther King Jr. (center), and Coretta Scott King (front, far right), during a 1965 Selma march

Perkins was a supporter of the Democratic Party and aligned himself with various progressive causes, including civil rights and feminism. In 1965, he participated in the Selma to Montgomery marches advocating for African American voting rights. He performed at the "Stars for Freedom" rally, where he entertained marchers by singing folk songs and delivering short remarks.

He was also an advocate for gender equality. In 1983, Perkins stated, "Women's liberation has liberated me too". He spoke in favor of shared parental responsibilities, asserting that men should be involved in nurturing roles such as feeding and changing diapers.

Though he remained largely private about his own sexuality during his lifetime, Perkins occasionally voiced support for gay rights. In an interview with author Boze Hadleigh, he described the notion that marriage should be exclusively between a man and a woman as "archaic", and noted that the ability to raise children was not limited to heterosexual couples.

In addition to his advocacy, Perkins supported causes related to HIV/AIDS. Before his own diagnosis, he volunteered with Project Angel Food, a nonprofit organization that delivers meals to individuals affected by HIV and AIDS. In September 1986, he also appeared in a public service announcement encouraging the public to "fight AIDS with the facts".

=== Religion ===
Perkins identified as an atheist throughout his life, though he celebrated holidays such as Christmas in a secular, non-religious context.

Perkins rarely spoke publicly about religion. When he did express personal views, they often related to the intersection of religion and social issues. In his interview with Boze Hadleigh, Perkins criticized the use of religion to oppose same-sex marriage, remarking, "Common sense isn't really that common, particularly when religion enters the picture".

== Death ==
During the filming of Psycho IV: The Beginning, Perkins was undergoing treatment for facial palsy. He was tested for HIV after an article in the tabloid newspaper National Enquirer said he was HIV-positive. Berenson said Perkins had not been tested for HIV but had been given a series of blood tests in Los Angeles for the palsy on the side of his face. Berenson said she assumed that someone had tested his blood for the virus and leaked the results to the tabloid.

Perkins hid his AIDS diagnosis from the public for two years, going in and out of hospitals under assumed names. During this time, his wife and children were regularly tested. It was not until a few weeks before his death that he went public with his condition, although he had been working on films during his illness. He died at his Los Angeles home on September 12, 1992, from AIDS-related pneumonia, at age 60. In a statement prepared before his death, Perkins said, "I chose not to go public about [having AIDS] because, to misquote Casablanca, 'I'm not much good at being noble,' but it doesn't take much to see that the problems of one old actor don't amount to a hill of beans in this crazy world. I have learned more about love, selflessness and human understanding from the people I have met in this great adventure in the world of AIDS than I ever did in the cutthroat, competitive world in which I spent my life."

His urn, inscribed "Don't Fence Me In", is in an altar on the terrace of his former home in the Hollywood Hills.

== Legacy ==
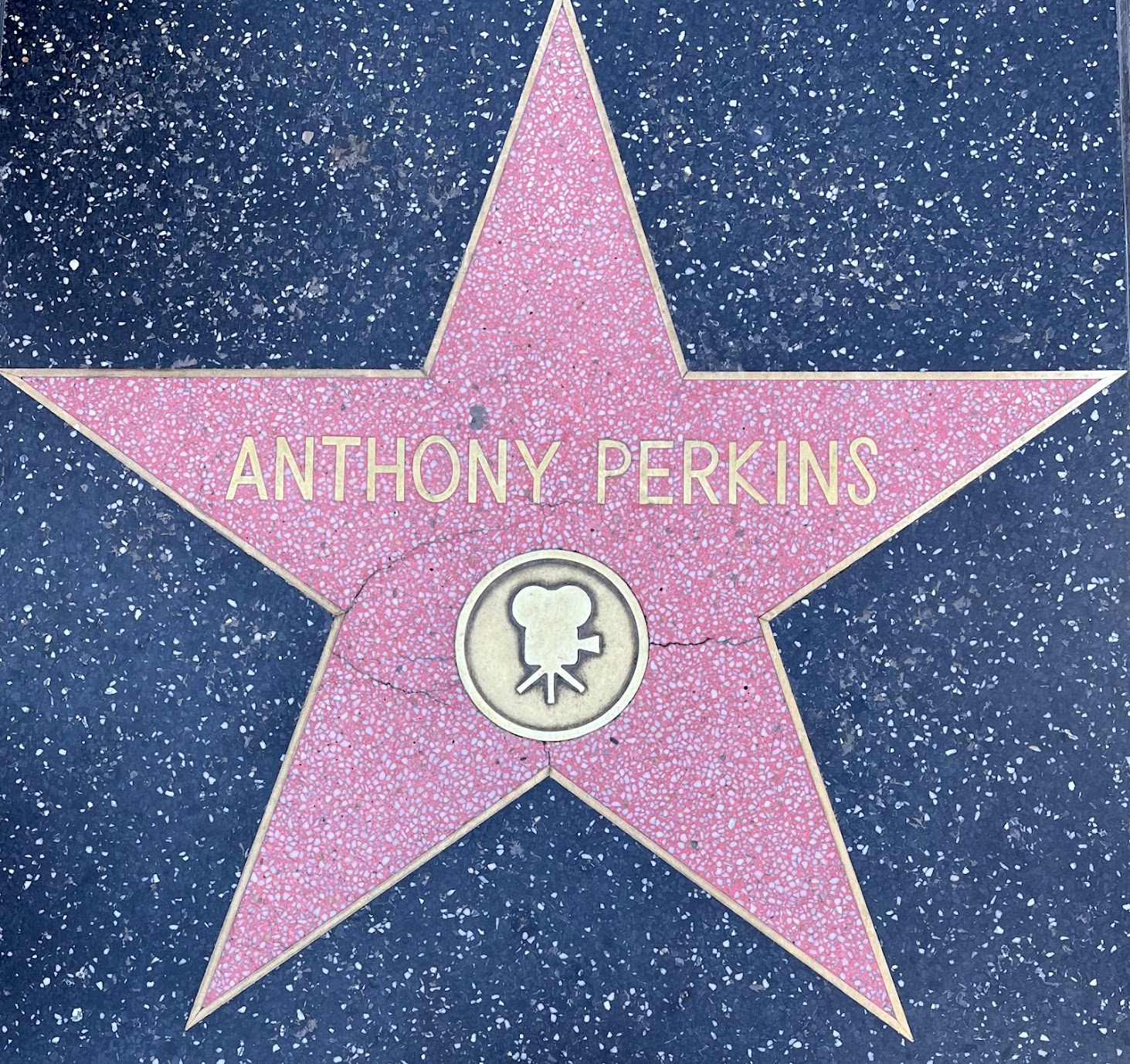
Perkins's star on the Walk of Fame for Motion Pictures, located at 6821 Hollywood Blvd.

Perkins's defining role as Norman Bates has made him a cultural icon. Since Psycho's 1960 release, countless references, spoofs, and documentaries have been made about the thriller and his homicidal character, and it has led many to pronounce the motion picture as the greatest horror film of all time. The American Film Institute named Norman Bates the second greatest villain of all time, only behind Hannibal Lecter from The Silence of the Lambs.

The character of Norman Bates has been referenced numerous times in both music and film. In 1964, four years after the release of Psycho, Bob Dylan referenced the film extensively on his track "Motorpsycho Nitemare", a humorous tale about a traveling salesman. Perkins is mentioned by name:

There stood Rita
Lookin' just like Tony Perkins
She said "Would you like to take a shower?
I'll show you up to the door"
I said, "Oh, no! no!
I've been through this movie before"

In 1977, Blondie referenced Norman Bates on their track "Kidnapper": "Hey, you've got an unnerving face/And twitchin' eyes like Norman Bates." In 1981, English band Landscape released the song "Norman Bates" with the chorus "My name is Norman Bates; I'm just a normal guy." In 1999, Eminem referenced Bates on "Role Model": "I'm 'bout as normal as Norman Bates with deformative traits/... Mother, are you there? I love you/I never meant to hit you over the head with that shovel (That shovel)." In 2004, Kanye West paid homage to Perkins's homicidal character on "Gossip Files": "Uh, they are the dream (Killer Norman Bates)." In 2015, fifty-five years after the film's release, Lil Wayne mentioned the character on "Amazing Amy": "I'm Norman Bates and this bitch ain't normal, our kids gon' be nuts (Not the babies!)." Perkins is mentioned by name in the 1996 horror film Scream when a character quotes a line of dialogue from Psycho: "'We all go a little mad sometimes'–Anthony Perkins, Psycho."

Perkins's first major motion picture, Friendly Persuasion, received an abrupt resurgence in interest in the 1980s after President Ronald Reagan labeled the film as his favorite. It also served diplomatic purposes: during one of their five summit meetings, Reagan gifted the film to Soviet General Secretary Mikhail Gorbachev because he viewed the film as symbolic of the need to find an alternative to war as a means of resolving differences between peoples. Fear Strikes Out also was subjected to similar treatment after it was nominated for the American Film Institute's 2008 list in the sports film category. His European films were also praised: eight years after Perkins's death, film critic Roger Ebert called The Trial a masterpiece.

Despite not winning any awards, many of Perkins's films have gained cult followings throughout the years, including The Trial and Pretty Poison. Television appearances such as Evening Primrose and Remember My Name also received popularity, with Michael Jackson being a fan of Evening Primrose. The same occurred with The Black Hole and Crimes of Passion.

Actor Sebastian Stan has cited Perkins as an influence: "I have a bit of an obsession with the 1950s and all those actors from Montgomery Clift to James Dean and Anthony Perkins. Just that whole era of Tennessee Williams to Elia Kazan. The whole idea of New York and the whole thing becomes kind of romantic in your head." Jane Fonda credited Perkins alone with making her comfortable in front of the camera, and Michael Simkims, who worked with Perkins several months before his death on A Demon in My View, remembered Perkins well for his professionalism and willingness to help anyone, including himself, who was having trouble with a scene. Established actors admired his abilities, as Maria Cooper Janis remembered about her father, Gary Cooper: "I know my father adored Tony Perkins. He thought he was one hell of an actor."

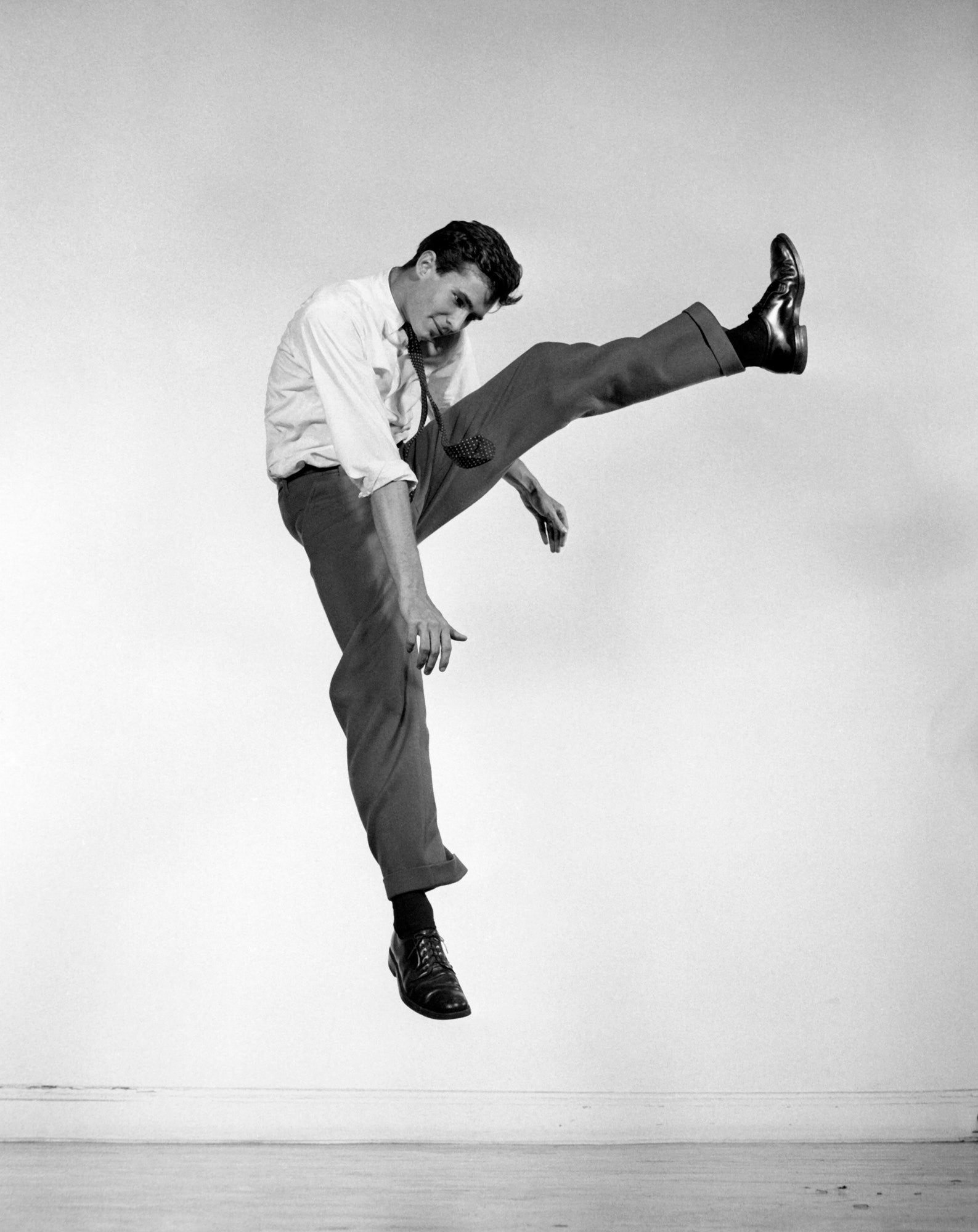
Anthony Perkins leaping for Philippe Halsman's "Jump" series

Perkins was a part of Philippe Halsman's "Jump" series, in which Halsman requested all featured celebrities to leap for him under the impression that while people were trained in many other things, no one was ever taught how to jump. Alongside numerous Hollywood contemporaries such as Eartha Kitt, Audrey Hepburn, Marilyn Monroe, Sammy Davis Jr., Grace Kelly, Sophia Loren, and Tab Hunter, Halsman's photo of a jumping Perkins has been widely reproduced and shared over the years.

For his work, Perkins received two stars on the Hollywood Walk of Fame: one for motion pictures (6821 Hollywood Blvd.) and one for television (6801 Hollywood Blvd.).

His death from AIDS-related causes also greatly affected how he was remembered. Alongside Rock Hudson, Perkins is considered one of the most significant actors to have died from the disease. There were countless tributes to him around the world, coming from news stations and average citizens. In New Zealand, Perkins was one of several notable people honored in their national AIDS remembrance quilt in 1994.

Although rumors had always persisted, Perkins was not confirmed as gay until a posthumous biography by Charles Winecoff titled Split Image: the Life of Anthony Perkins was published in 1996. The book is about Perkins's personal life and his battle with his sexuality while being, during the first years as an actor, a poster-child for heterosexual men, something the author claimed deeply tormented him.

In 2005, former partner Tab Hunter released the memoir Tab Hunter Confidential, in which he publicly came out as gay. In the autobiography, he admitted to his relationship with Perkins for the first time after having previously denied it to biographers. He detailed their three to four-year affair, with its many ups and downs. "We were both drawn to each other because we were both ambitious young actors swimming in the Hollywood fishbowl," Hunter wrote, "where the waters are dark and murky and treacherous, especially if you've got a 'secret.'"

Seven years later, Perkins was portrayed by British actor James D'Arcy in the 2012 biographical drama Hitchcock, which starred Anthony Hopkins as Alfred Hitchcock and Helen Mirren as Alma Reville, about the filming of Psycho. His character was featured briefly, with most of the screen time going to Scarlett Johansson, who played Janet Leigh. His homosexuality was never explicitly mentioned, but it was heavily implied. Three years afterwards, Tab Hunter released the Jeffrey Schwarz-directed documentary Tab Hunter Confidential, where he further elaborated on his life as a closeted movie star and surviving show-business. Perkins was a substantial addition in the film, whom Hunter said he had a "wonderful relationship with. I was comfortable with him. I did trust him." He also spoke for the first time about his reaction to Perkins's wife, children, and conversion therapy. The film was well received by critics, and Perkins's relationship with Hunter became a popular story that circulated through newspapers.

In 2016, a year following Tab Hunter Confidential's release, Perkins's son, Osgood, released the Netflix-distributed I Am the Pretty Thing That Lives in the House, a horror film about a caretaker for an elderly woman. Paula Prentiss, who had starred alongside Perkins in Catch-22, was cast because of her association with Perkins and was the only option his son had in mind. In interviews, Osgood discussed how the film was a way to connect with his deceased father and how horror was the only way to do it as Perkins was a horror icon. The soundtrack for the film was composed by Elvis Perkins, Perkins's second son, and "You Keep Coming Back (Like a Song)" from Perkins's 1958 From My Heart... album was a central part of the plot. In the film, the characters can also be seen watching Friendly Persuasion.

In 2018, Zachary Quinto and J. J. Abrams announced that a film based on Perkins was in development. Titled Tab and Tony, the film would follow the Tab Hunter/Anthony Perkins relationship from Hunter's prospective and was based on both Hunter's documentary and memoir. Pulitzer Prize and Tony Award-winning writer Doug Wright was attached to create the screenplay, and after Hunter's death a month after the announcement, Quinto announced that they would continue plans to create the film. In 2019, Allan Glaser, Tab Hunter's husband, who joined the film as a producer, gave an update about the film's progress and stated that Andrew Garfield was a possible candidate to play Perkins.

Perkins was portrayed by Joey Pollari in the 2025 Netflix crime drama series Monster: The Ed Gein Story. The series emphasized the actor's homosexuality and his struggles with his orientation. Perkins's son Osgood strongly objected to his father's depiction in the series, which he refused to watch given the liberties taken by Netflix's Monster anthology.

== Filmography ==
=== Film ===
Year	Title	Role	Notes
1953	The Actress	Fred Whitmarsh	Film debut
1956	Friendly Persuasion	Josh Birdwell	Golden Globe Award for Most Promising Newcomer – Male; Photoplay Award for Most Promising Male Star; Nominated—Academy Award for Best Supporting Actor
1957	Fear Strikes Out	Jim Piersall	
1957	The Lonely Man	Riley Wade	
1957	The Tin Star	Sheriff Ben Owens	
1957	This Angry Age	Joseph Dufresne	Alternative title: The Sea Wall
1958	Desire Under the Elms	Eben Cabot	
1958	The Matchmaker	Cornelius Hackl	
1959	Green Mansions	Abel	
1959	On the Beach	Lt. Commander Peter Holmes	
1960	Tall Story	Ray Blent	
1960	Hedda Hopper's Hollywood	Himself	TV movie
1960	Psycho	Norman Bates	International Board of Motion Picture Reviewers Award for Best Actor; Online Film and Television Association Award for Best Film Character; Nominated—Bambi Award for Best International Actor; Nominated—Bravo Otto Award for Best Actor (for film's 1961 global release, honored along with Goodbye Again, also 1961)
1961	Goodbye Again	Philip Van der Besh	French title: Aimez-vous Brahms ? Cannes Film Festival Award for Best Actor; David di Donatello for Best Foreign Actor; Nominated—Bambi Award for Best International Actor; Nominated—Bravo Otto Award for Best Actor (with Psycho, internationally released in 1961)
1962	Phaedra	Alexis	Nominated—Bravo Otto Award for Best Actor
1962	Five Miles to Midnight	Robert Macklin	Nominated—Bravo Otto Award for Best Actor
1962	The Trial	Josef K.	Nominated—Bravo Otto Award for Best Actor
1962	Two Are Guilty	Johnny Parsons	Nominated—Bravo Otto Award for Best Actor
1962	Beach Casanova	Himself (archive footage - uncredited)	Alternative title: I Don Giovanni della Costa Azzurra
1963	Hollywood: The Great Stars	Robert Macklin (archive footage - Five Miles to Midnight)	TV movie
1964	The Ravishing Idiot	Harry Compton / Nicholas Maukouline	
1965	The Fool Killer	Milo Bogardus	Alternative title: Violent Journey
1966	Is Paris Burning?	Sgt. Warren	
1967	Romy - Portrait eines Gesichts	Josef K. (archive footage - The Trial)	TV movie
1967	The Champagne Murders	Christopher Belling	
1968	Pretty Poison	Dennis Pitt	
1969	King: A Filmed Record... Montgomery to Memphis	Himself (archive footage)	
1970	Catch-22	Chaplain Tappman	Nominated—National Society of Film Critics Award for Best Supporting Actor
1970	WUSA	Morgan Rainey	Nominated—National Society of Film Critics Award for Best Supporting Actor
1970	How Awful About Allan	Allan Colleigh	TV movie
1971	Someone Behind the Door	Laurence Jeffries	Alternative title: Two Minds for Murder
1971	Ten Days' Wonder	Charles Van Horn	
1972	Play It as It Lays	B.Z. Mendenhall	
1972	The Life and Times of Judge Roy Bean	Reverend LaSalle	
1973	The Last of Sheila	—N/a	Co-writer with Stephen Sondheim; Edgar Allan Poe Award for Best Motion Picture Screenplay [Shared with Sondheim]
1974	Lovin' Molly	Gid Frye	
1974	Murder on the Orient Express	Hector McQueen	
1975	Mahogany	Sean McAvoy	
1976	America at the Movies	Josh Birdwell (archive footage - Friendly Persuasion)	TV movie
1978	Remember My Name	Neil Curry	
1978	First, You Cry	Arthur Heroz	TV movie
1978	Les Misérables	Javert	TV movie
1979	Winter Kills	John Cerruti	
1979	Twice a Woman	Alfred Boeken	
1979	The Black Hole	Dr. Alex Durant	
1979	The Horror Show	Himself – Host	TV movie
1980	North Sea Hijack	Lou Kramer	Alternative titles: ffolkes and Assault Force
1980	Deadly Companion	Lawrence Miles	Alternative title: Double Negative
1983	The Sins of Dorian Gray	Henry Lord	TV movie
1983	Psycho II	Norman Bates	
1984	Terror in the Aisles	Norman Bates (archive footage - Psycho)	
1984	Crimes of Passion	Reverend Peter Shayne	
1985	Hitchcock: il brividio del genio	Himself	TV movie
1986	Psycho III	Norman Bates	Also director; Nominated—Saturn Award for Best Actor
1988	Destroyer	Robert Edwards	
1988	Lucky Stiff	—N/a	Director
1989	Edge of Sanity	Dr. Henry Jekyll / Jack "The Ripper" Hyde	
1990	Daughter of Darkness	Anton / Prince Constantine	TV movie
1990	I'm Dangerous Tonight	Professor Buchanan	TV movie
1990	Psycho IV: The Beginning	Norman Bates	TV movie
1990	With Orson Welles: Stories of a Life in Film	Himself	TV movie
1990	Alfred Hitchcock: The Art of Making Movies	Himself	TV movie
1991	A Demon in My View	Arthur Johnson	
1992	The Naked Target	El Mecano	
1992	In the Deep Woods	Paul Miller, P.I.	TV movie (final film role; released posthumously)
2000	The American Nightmare	Norman Bates (archive footage - Psycho)	
2001	Boogeymen: The Killer Compilation	Norman Bates (archive footage - Psycho)	
2005	Filmmakers vs. Tycoons	Josef K. (archive footage - The Trial)	
2010	The Psycho Legacy	Himself — Norman Bates (archive footage - Psycho, Psycho II, Psycho III, Psycho IV: The Beginning)	
2014	Magician: The Astonishing Life and Work of Orson Welles	Himself (archive footage)	
2017	78/52	Himself — Norman Bates (archive footage - Psycho)	
2018	They'll Love Me When I'm Dead	Himself (archive footage - uncredited)	
2019	Sympathy for the Devil: Revisiting "Psycho II"	Himself — Norman Bates (archive footage - Psycho, Psycho II)	
2019	Hitchcock Confidential	Himself — Norman Bates (archive footage - Psycho)	TV movie
2020	Anthony Perkins, l'homme derrière	Himself – Subject (archive footage)	TV movie
2022	My Name is Alfred Hitchcock	Himself — Norman Bates (archive footage - Psycho)	

=== Television ===
Year	Title	Role	Notes
1953	The Big Story	Ralph Darrow	Episode: "Robert Billeter of the Pendleton Times of Franklin, West Virginia"
1954	Kraft Television Theatre		Episode: "The Missing Years"
1954	Armstrong Circle Theatre	Philippe	Episode: "The Fugitive"
1954	The Man Behind the Badge	Pedro	Episode: "The Case of the Square Hipsters, East Baton Rouge, LA. Jr. Sheriff"
1954	The Man Behind the Badge	Pedro	Episode: "The Case of the Narcotics Racket"
1954	You Are There		Episode: "The Surrender of Wake Island"
1955	Wide Wide World	Himself	Episode: "America's Heritage"
1956	Kraft Television Theatre	Willie O'Reilly	Episode: "Home Is the Hero"
1956	Studio One	Clyde Smith	Episode: "The Silent Gun"
1956	Front Row Center	Dexter Green	Episode: "Winter Dreams"
1956	Goodyear Television Playhouse	Joey	Episode: "Joey"
1957	General Electric Theater	West Wind	Episode: "Mr. Blue Ocean"
1957	Windows	Benji	Episode: "The World Out There"
1957	The Ed Sullivan Show	Himself – Guest (as Tony Perkins)	Episode: "Bill Haley & the Comets, Lena Horne, Tony Perkins, Jack Paar, George DeWitt, Alfred Apaka, Senator George Smathers"
1957	The Steve Allen Plymouth Show	Himself – Guest (as Tony Perkins)	Episode: "Anthony Perkins, Broderick Crawford, Joanne Dru, Xavier Cugat & Abbe Lane, Johnny Puleo & his Harmonica Gang, cameo by Killer Joe Piro"
1957	Person to Person	Himself – Interviewee	Episode: "Episode #5.6"
1957	The Steve Allen Plymouth Show	Himself – Guest (as Tony Perkins)	Episode: "Anthony Perkins, Mahalia Jackson, Gertrude Berg, George London, the U.N. Singers"
1957	What's My Line?	Himself – Mystery Guest	Episode: "Jolie Gabor & Anthony Perkins"
1957	Muscular Dystrophy Telethon	Himself – Guest	TV special
1958	The Mike Wallace Interview	Himself – Interviewee	Episode: "Episode #1.48"
1958	The Tonight Show Starring Jack Paar	Himself – Guest	Episode: "Episode #1.193"
1959	What's My Line?	Himself – Mystery Guest	Episode: "Anthony Perkins"
1959	What's My Line?	Himself – Guest Panelist	Episode: "Gary Cooper"
1960	The Tonight Show Starring Jack Paar	Himself – Guest	Episode: "Episode: #3.154"
1960	What's My Line?	Himself – Guest Panelist	Episode: "Jane Wyman"
1960	I've Got a Secret	Himself – Guest Star	Episode: "Anthony Perkins"
1961	Treffpunkt New York	Himself – Interviewee	Episode: "Episode #1.2"
1961	What's My Line?	Himself – Guest Panelist	Episode: "Dorothy Kilgallen"
1961	Reflets de Cannes	Himself – Interviewee	Episode: "16 May 1961"
1962	Cinépanorama	Himself – Interviewee	Episode: "3 March 1962"
1962	Discorama	Himself – Guest Performer	Episode: "12 April 1962"
1962	Password	Himself – Celebrity Contestant	Episode: "Anthony Perkins vs. Peggy Cass" (evening show)
1962	The Merv Griffin Show	Himself – Guest	Episode: "Anthony Perkins, Carmel Quinn, Henny Youngman, Milt Kamen, Guy Rotondo, Lester Lanin"
1962	The World of Sophia Loren	Himself	TV special
1963	Password	Himself – Celebrity Contestant	Episode: "Dina Merrill vs. Anthony Perkins" (evening show)
1963	What's My Line?	Himself – Mystery Guest	Episode: "Anthony Perkins"
1963	I've Got a Secret	Himself – Panelist (as Tony Perkins)	Episode: "Ann Sothern"
1963	Password	Himself – Celebrity Contestant	Episode: "Olivia de Havilland vs. Anthony Perkins" (evening show)
1963	Password	Himself – Celebrity Contestant	Episode: "Carol Burnett vs. Anthony Perkins" (evening show)
1964	The New Steve Allen Show	Himself – Guest	Episode: "Anthony Perkins, Dee Stratton"
1964	Password	Himself – Celebrity Contestant	Episode: "Paula Prentiss vs. Anthony Perkins" (evening show)
1964	The 21st Annual Golden Globe Awards	Himself	TV special
1964	Inside the Movie Kingdom – 1964	Himself	TV special
1964	What's My Line?	Himself – Guest Panelist	Episode: "Elizabeth Ashley"
1966	ABC Stage 67	Charles Snell	Episode: "Evening Primrose"
1967	Today	Himself – Guest	Episode: "2 January 1967"
1967	The Mike Douglas Show	Himself – Guest	Episode: "Episode #6.89"
1967	The Merv Griffin Show	Himself – Guest	Episode: "Anthony Perkins, Lynn Redgrave, Bobby Rydell"
1967	Password	Himself – Celebrity Contestant	Episode: "Arlene Francis vs. Anthony Perkins" (evening show)
1967	The Merv Griffin Show	Himself – Guest	Episode: "Tom Ewell, Anthony Perkins, Lionel Hampton, Lotte Lenya"
1967	The Merv Griffin Show	Himself – Guest	Episode: "Clint Eastwood, Anthony Perkins, Marty Brill, Milt Kamen, Kaye Hart, Aliza Kashi"
1967	The Merv Griffin Show	Himself – Guest	Episode: "Jack Douglas and Reiko, Richard Crenna, Renee Taylor, Flip Wilson, Captain Vernon Lowell, Anthony Perkins"
1967	The Merv Griffin Show	Himself – Guest	Episode: "Anthony Perkins, Pat McCormick, Donna Jean Young, Helen Gurley Brown, Arthur Prysock, Ronnie Martin"
1967	The Merv Griffin Show	Himself – Guest	Episode: "Anthony Perkins, Gabriel Dell, Susan Strasberg, Shelley Berman, Aliza Kashi, Barbara B. Baugh, Helen Gurley Brown"
1968	The Woody Woodbury Show	Himself – Guest	Episode: "13 March 1964"
1968	Dee Time	Himself – Guest	Episode: "Episode #3.39"
1968	BBC Play of the Month	Tommy Turner	Episode: "The Male Animal"
1970	The Dick Cavett Show	Himself – Guest	Episode: "Episode #4.99"
1970	The Tonight Show Starring Johnny Carson	Himself – Guest	Episode: "22 July 1970"
1970	The David Frost Show	Himself – Interviewee	Episode: "Episode #2.252"
1970	The Tonight Show Starring Johnny Carson	Himself – Guest	Episode: "14 September 1970"
1972	V.I.P.-Schaukel	Himself – Guest	Episode: "Episode #2.2"
1973	The Dick Cavett Show	Himself – Guest	Episode: "Alexander Bickel/Richard Kuh/Truman Capote/Anthony Perkins/Bishop Paul Moore/Dr. Natalie Shainess/Ephraim London, Part 1"
1973	The Dick Cavett Show	Himself – Guest	Episode: "Alexander Bickel/Richard Kuh/Truman Capote/Anthony Perkins/Bishop Paul Moore/Dr. Natalie Shainess/Ephraim London, Part 2"
1974	The Mike Douglas Show	Himself – Guest	Episode: "Episode #13.142"
1975	The Film Society Of Lincoln Center Annual Gala Tribute to Paul Newman and Joanne Woodward	Himself – Speaker	TV special
1975	The Mike Douglas Show	Himself – Guest	Episode: "Episode #14.214"
1975	Dinah!	Himself – Guest	Episode: "Episode #2.49"
1976	Saturday Night Live	Himself – Host / Norman Bates / Various	Episode: "Anthony Perkins/Betty Carter" (Season 1, Episode 16)
1976	The Annual Theatre World Awards	Himself – Presenter	TV special
1976	The Mike Douglas Show	Himself – Guest	Episode: "Episode #16.36"
1977	AFI Life Achievement Award: A Tribute to Bette	Himself – Audience Member	TV special
1979	AFI Life Achievement Award: A Tribute to Alfred Hitchcock	Himself	TV special
1980	The Dick Cavett Show	Himself – Guest	Episode: "Anthony Perkins"
1980	Dinah!	Himself – Guest	Episode: "Episode #6.85"
1980	34th Annual Tony Awards	Himself – Presenter	TV special
1980	Hour Magazine	Himself – Guest	Episode: "17 December 1980"
1982	Night of 100 Stars	Himself	TV special
1982	Arena	Himself	Episode: "The Orson Welles Story: Part 1"
1982	Arena	Himself	Episode: "The Orson Welles Story: Part 2"
1983	For the Term of His Natural Life	Reverend James North	TV miniseries, 3 episodes
1983	Film '72	Himself – Interviewee	Episode: "Episode #12.34"
1983	De película	Himself – Interviewee	Episode: "En torno a Anthony Perkins"
1983	Bitte umblättern	Himself – Interviewee	Episode: "6 June 1983"
1983	One on One	Himself – Interviewee	Episode: "Anthony Perkins"
1983	Psycho II: Still Crazy After All These Years	Himself – Interviewee	TV short (featurette/documentary)
1984	The Tonight Show Starring Johnny Carson	Himself – Guest	Episode: "Episode #23.185"
1984	The Glory Boys	Jimmy	TV miniseries, 3 episodes
1985	Great Performances: The Best of Broadway	Himself – Performer	TV special
1985	Entertainment Tonight	Himself	Episode: "6 September 1985"
1986	40th Annual Tony Awards	Himself – Performer	TV special
1986	The Tonight Show Starring Johnny Carson	Himself – Guest	Episode: "24 June 1986"
1986	Hour Magazine	Himself – Guest	Episode: "3 July 1986"
1986	Late Night with David Letterman	Himself – Guest	Episode: "7 July 1986"
1986	The Tonight Show Starring Johnny Carson	Himself – Guest	Episode: "17 July 1986"
1986	Cinéma cinémas	Himself	Episode: "Shock Corridor"
1986	El carrer de l'espectacle	Himself – Interviewee	Episode: "14 October 1986"
1986	Na sowas!	Himself – Guest	Episode: "Episode #6.4"
1986	De película	Himself – Interviewee	Episode: "Panorama de actualidad VIII"
1986	De película	Himself – Interviewee	Episode: "Sitges 86"
1986	Inédits	Himself – Interviewee	Episode: "Anthony Perkins"
1986	King Kong! The Living Legend	Himself	TV special
1987	The Late Show	Himself – Guest	Episode: "Friday the 13th Horror Show"
1987	De película	Himself – Interviewee	Episode: "Cartelera de TVE VII"
1987	The Tonight Show Starring Johnny Carson	Himself – Guest	Episode: "Episode #26.115"
1987	Napoleon and Josephine: A Love Story	Talleyrand	TV miniseries, 3 episodes
1988	Joan Rivers and Friends Salute Heidi Abromowitz	Himself – Anthony Perkins	TV special
1989	Drevet vend la mèche	Himself – Guest	Episode: "20 January 1989"
1989	The Tonight Show Starring Johnny Carson	Himself – Guest	Episode: "Episode #28.49"
1989	The Arsenio Hall Show	Himself – Guest	Episode: "#1.78"
1989	The Arsenio Hall Show	Himself – Guest	Episode: "#1.145"
1990	Chillers	Himself – Host	12 episodes
1990	The Ghost Writer	Anthony Strack	Unsold TV pilot
1990	The Grand Opening of Universal Studios New Theme Park Attraction Gala	Himself	TV special
1990	The Horror Hall of Fame	Himself – Presenter	TV special
1990	Late Night with David Letterman	Himself – Guest	Episode: "3 October 1990"
1990	Un dia és un dia	Himself – Guest	Episode: "#2.16" (Season 2, Episode 16)
1991	The Film Society Of Lincoln Center Annual Gala Tribute to Audrey Hepburn	Himself – Speaker	TV special
1991	Wetten, das..?	Himself – Interviewee	Episode: "Aus Saarbrücken" (Season 11, Episode 69)
1991	Hollymünd	Himself – Interviewee	Episode: "23 September 1991"
1991	NDR Talk Show	Himself – Interviewee	Episode: "27 September 1991" (Season 13, Episode 11)
1991	Aspekte	Himself – Interviewee	Episode: "27 September 1991" (Season 27, Episode 38)
1992	Reflections on the Silver Screen	Himself – Interviewee	Episode: "Anthony Perkins" (Season 3, Episode 5); final recorded interview (aired posthumously)
1994	100 Years at the Movies	Norman Bates (archive footage)	TV short
1998	E! True Hollywood Story	Himself – Subject (archive footage)	Episode: "Anthony Perkins"
1999	Biography	Himself – Subject (archive footage)	Episode: "Anthony Perkins: A Life in the Shadows"
2003	AFI's 100 Years...100 Heroes & Villains	Norman Bates – No. 2 Villain (archive footage)	TV special
2005	Live from New York: The First 5 Years of Saturday Night Live	Himself – Host (archive footage)	TV special

=== Stage ===
Year	Title	Role	Theatre	Notes
1954–55	Tea and Sympathy	Tom Lee	Ethel Barrymore Theatre, New York City	Broadway (replacement for John Kerr)
1957–59	Look Homeward, Angel	Eugene Gant	Ethel Barrymore Theatre, New York City	Broadway
1960	Greenwillow	Gideon Briggs	Alvin Theatre, New York City	Broadway
1962	Harold	Harold Selbar	Cort Theatre, New York City	Broadway
1966–67	The Star-Spangled Girl	Andy Hobart	Plymouth Theatre, New York City	Broadway
1970	Steambath	Tandy	Truck and Warehouse Theater, New York City	Off-Broadway (also director)
1974	The Wager	—N/a	Eastside Playhouse, New York City	Off-Broadway (director)
1975–76	Equus	Martin Dysart	Plymouth Theatre, New York City	Broadway (replacement for Anthony Hopkins)
1979–80	Romantic Comedy	Jason Carmichael	Ethel Barrymore Theatre, New York City	Broadway

== Discography ==
Year	Album	Label
1957	Orchestra Under the Direction of Martin Paich	Epic Records
1958	On A Rainy Afternoon	RCA Victor
1958	From My Heart ...	RCA Victor
1964	Anthony Perkins	Pathé

== See also ==
- List of LGBTQ people from New York City
