= Line J =

Line J may refer to:

== Transit ==
- Line J, a line on the Metrocable in Medellín, Colombia
- J Line, part of the RapidRide bus system in King County, WA
- J Line (Los Angeles Metro), a bus rapid transit line in Los Angeles County, California
- J (Los Angeles Railway), a train line operated 1920–1963
- J Church, a Muni Metro Rail Line in San Francisco, CA
- J Nassau Street Local, part of the J/Z (New York City Subway service)
- Gisors Line J, part of the Transilien Paris-Saint-Lazare
- Metro J Line (Minnesota), a planned bus rapid transit line in Minneapolis–Saint Paul, Minnesota

== Other ==
- j-line, a moduli scheme in elliptic curve arithmetic
