= Twists of elliptic curves =

Mathematical curves that are isomorphic over algebraic closures

In the mathematical field of algebraic geometry, an elliptic curve E over a field K has an associated quadratic twist, that is another elliptic curve which is isomorphic to E over an algebraic closure of K. In particular, an isomorphism between elliptic curves is an isogeny of degree 1, that is an invertible isogeny. Some curves have higher order twists such as cubic and quartic twists. The curve and its twists have the same j-invariant.

Applications of twists include cryptography, the solution of Diophantine equations, and when generalized to hyperelliptic curves, the study of the Sato–Tate conjecture.

== Quadratic twist ==
First assume $K$ is a field of characteristic different from 2. Let $E$ be an elliptic curve over $K$ of the form:

$$y^2 = x^3 + a_2 x^2 +a_4 x + a_6. \,$$

Given $d\neq 0$ not a square in $K$, the quadratic twist of $E$ is the curve $E^d$, defined by the equation:

$$dy^2 = x^3 + a_2 x^2 + a_4 x + a_6. \,$$

or equivalently

$$y^2 = x^3 + d a_2 x^2 + d^2 a_4 x + d^3 a_6. \,$$

The two elliptic curves $E$ and $E^d$ are not isomorphic over $K$, but rather over the field extension $K(\sqrt{d})$. Qualitatively speaking, the arithmetic of a curve and its quadratic twist can look very different in the field $K$, while the complex analysis of the curves is the same; and so a family of curves related by twisting becomes a useful setting in which to study the arithmetic properties of elliptic curves.

Twists can also be defined when the base field $K$ is of characteristic 2. Let $E$ be an elliptic curve over $K$ of the form:

$$y^2 + a_1 x y +a_3 y = x^3 + a_2 x^2 +a_4 x + a_6. \,$$

Given $d\in K$ such that $X^2+X+d$ is an irreducible polynomial over $K$, the quadratic twist of $E$ is the curve $E^d$, defined by the equation:

$$y^2 + a_1 x y +a_3 y = x^3 + (a_2 + d a_1^2) x^2 +a_4 x + a_6 + d a_3^2. \,$$

The two elliptic curves $E$ and $E^d$ are not isomorphic over $K$, but over the field extension $K[X]/(X^2+X+d)$.

=== Quadratic twist over finite fields ===
If $K$ is a finite field with $q$ elements, then for all $x$ there exist a $y$ such that the point $(x,y)$ belongs to $E$ or $E^d$ (or possibly both). In fact, if $(x,y)$ is on just one of the curves, there is exactly one other $y'$ on that same curve (which can happen if the characteristic is not $2$).

As a consequence, $|E(K)|+|E^d(K)| = 2 q+2$ or equivalently $t_{E^d} = - t_E$, where $t_E$ is the trace of the Frobenius endomorphism of the curve.

== Quartic twist ==
It is possible to "twist" elliptic curves with j-invariant equal to 1728 by quartic characters; twisting a curve $E$ by a quartic twist, one obtains precisely four curves: one is isomorphic to $E$, one is its quadratic twist, and only the other two are really new. Also in this case, twisted curves are isomorphic over the field extension given by the twist degree.

== Cubic twist ==
Analogously to the quartic twist case, an elliptic curve over $K$ with j-invariant equal to zero can be twisted by cubic characters. The curves obtained are isomorphic to the starting curve over the field extension given by the twist degree.

== Generalization ==
Twists can be defined for other smooth projective curves as well. Let $K$ be a field and $C$ be curve over that field, i.e., a projective variety of dimension 1 over $K$ that is irreducible and geometrically connected. Then a twist $C'$ of $C$ is another smooth projective curve for which there exists a $\bar{K}$-isomorphism between $C'$ and $C$, where the field $\bar{K}$ is the algebraic closure of $K$.

== Examples ==
- Twisted Hessian curves
- Twisted Edwards curve
- Twisted tripling-oriented Doche–Icart–Kohel curve
