= Harold Edwards (mathematician) =

American mathematician (1936–2020)

Harold Mortimer Edwards, Jr.
- Born: August 6, 1936; Champaign, Illinois, US
- Died: November 10, 2020 (aged 84); New York, New York, US
- Education: Harvard University
- Spouse: Betty Rollin
- Awards: Leroy P. Steele Prize
- Scientific career
- Fields: Mathematics
- Workplaces: New York University
- Doctoral advisor: Raoul Bott

Harold Mortimer Edwards, Jr. (August 6, 1936 – November 10, 2020) was an American mathematician working in number theory, algebra, and the history and philosophy of mathematics.

He was one of the co-founding editors, with Bruce Chandler, of The Mathematical Intelligencer. He is the author of expository books on the Riemann zeta function, on Galois theory, and on Fermat's Last Theorem. He wrote a book on Leopold Kronecker's work on divisor theory providing a systematic exposition of that work—a task that Kronecker never completed. He wrote textbooks on linear algebra, calculus, and number theory. He also wrote a book of essays on constructive mathematics. The Edwards curve is named after him.

Edwards graduated from the University of Wisconsin–Madison in 1956, received a Master of Arts from Columbia University in 1957, and a Ph.D from Harvard University in 1961, under the supervision of Raoul Bott. He taught at Harvard and Columbia University; he joined the faculty at New York University in 1966, and was an emeritus professor starting in 2002.

In 1980, Edwards won the Leroy P. Steele Prize for Mathematical Exposition of the American Mathematical Society, for his books on the Riemann zeta function and Fermat's Last Theorem. For his contribution in the field of the history of mathematics he was awarded the Albert Leon Whiteman Memorial Prize by the AMS in 2005. In 2012 he became a fellow of the American Mathematical Society.

Edwards was married to Betty Rollin, a former NBC News correspondent, author, and breast cancer survivor. Edwards died on November 10, 2020, of colon cancer.

== Books ==
- Higher Arithmetic: An Algorithmic Introduction to Number Theory (2008)
  An extension of Edwards' work in Essays in Constructive Mathematics, this textbook covers the material of a typical undergraduate number theory course, but follows a constructivist viewpoint in focusing on algorithms for solving problems rather than allowing purely existential solutions. The constructions are intended to be simple and straightforward, rather than efficient, so, unlike works on algorithmic number theory, there is no analysis of how efficient they are in terms of their running time.
- Essays in Constructive Mathematics (2005)
  Although motivated in part by the history and philosophy of mathematics, the main goal of this book is to show that advanced mathematics such as the fundamental theorem of algebra, the theory of binary quadratic forms, and the Riemann–Roch theorem can be handled in a constructivist framework. The second edition (2022) adds a new set of essays that reflect and expand upon the first. This was Edwards' final book, finished shortly before his death.
- Linear Algebra, Birkhäuser, (1995)
- Divisor Theory (1990)
  Algebraic divisors were introduced by Kronecker as an alternative to the theory of ideals. According to the citation for Edwards' Whiteman Prize, this book completes the work of Kronecker by providing "the sort of systematic and coherent exposition of divisor theory that Kronecker himself was never able to achieve."
- Galois Theory (1984)
  Galois theory is the study of the solutions of polynomial equations using abstract symmetry groups. This book puts the origins of the theory into their proper historical perspective, and carefully explains the mathematics in Évariste Galois' original manuscript (reproduced in translation).
  Mathematician Peter M. Neumann won the Lester R. Ford Award of the Mathematical Association of America in 1987 for his review of this book.
- Fermat's Last Theorem: A Genetic Introduction to Algebraic Number Theory (1977)
  As the word "genetic" in the title implies, this book on Fermat's Last Theorem is organized in terms of the origins and historical development of the subject. It was written some years prior to Wiles' proof of the theorem, and covers research related to the theorem only up to the work of Ernst Kummer, who used p-adic numbers and ideal theory to prove the theorem for a large class of exponents, the regular primes.
- Riemann's Zeta Function (1974)
  This book concerns the Riemann zeta function and the Riemann hypothesis on the location of the zeros of this function. It includes a translation of Riemann's original paper on these subjects, and analyzes this paper in depth; it also covers methods of computing the function such as Euler–Maclaurin summation and the Riemann–Siegel formula. However, it omits related research on other zeta functions with analogous properties to Riemann's function, as well as more recent work on the large sieve and density estimates.
- Advanced Calculus: A Differential Forms Approach (1969)
  This textbook uses differential forms as a unifying approach to multivariate calculus. Most chapters are self-contained. As an aid to learning the material, several important tools such as the implicit function theorem are described first in the simplified setting of affine maps before being extended to differentiable maps.

== See also ==
- Edwards curve and Twisted Edwards curve
