= Tripling-oriented Doche–Icart–Kohel curve =

Type of elliptic curve

The tripling-oriented Doche–Icart–Kohel curve is a form of an elliptic curve that has been used lately in cryptography; it is a particular type of Weierstrass curve. At certain conditions some operations, as adding, doubling or tripling points, are faster to compute using this form. The tripling-oriented Doche–Icart–Kohel curve, often called with the abbreviation 3DIK was introduced by Christophe Doche, Thomas Icart, and David R. Kohel in.

== Definition ==
A tripling-oriented Doche–Icart–Kohel curve of equation $y^2=x^3 - 3x^2 - 6x - 3$

Let $K$ be a field of characteristic different form 2 and 3.

An elliptic curve in tripling oriented Doche–Icart–Kohel form is defined by the equation:

$$T_a\  :\  y^2 = x^3 + 3a(x+1)^2$$

with $a\in K$.

A general point P on $T_{a}$ has affine coordinates $(x,y)$. The "point at infinity" represents the neutral element for the group law and it is written in projective coordinates as O = (0:1:0). The negation of a point P = (x, y) with respect to this neutral element is −P = (x, −y).

== The group law ==
Consider an elliptic curve in the Tripling-oriented Doche-Icart-Kohel form in affine coordinates:

$$T_a:\quad  y^2= x^3 + 3a(x+1)^2, \qquad a\neq 0, \tfrac{9}{4}.$$

As in other forms of elliptic curves, it is possible to define some "operations" between points, such as adding points, or doubling (See also The group law). In the following sections formulas to add, negate and doubling points are given. The addition and doubling formulas are often used for other operations: given a point P on an elliptic curve it is possible to compute [n]P, where n is an integer, using addition and doubling; computing multiples of points is important in elliptic curve cryptography and in Lenstra elliptic curve factorization.

=== Addition ===
Given $P_1=(x_1,y_1)$ and $P_2=(x_2,y_2)$ on $T_{a}$, the point $P_3=(x_3,y_3)=P_1+P_2$ has coordinates:

$$\begin{align}
x_3 &= \frac{1}{(x_2 - x_1)^2} \left \{ -x_1^3+(x_2-3a)x_1^2+(x_2^2+6ax_2)x_1+(y_1^2-2y_2y_1+(-x_2^3-3ax_2^2+y_2^2)) \right \} \\
y_3 &= \frac{1}{(x_2 - x_1)^3} \left \{ (-y_1+2y_2)x_1^3+(-3ay_1-3y_2x_2+3ay_2)x_1^2+(3x_2^2y_1+6ax_2y_1-6ay_2x_2)x_1 \right.\\
&\qquad \qquad \qquad \qquad \left.+(y_1^3-3y_2y_1^2+(-2x_2^3-3ax_2^2+3y_2^2)y_1+(y_2x_2^3+3ay_2x_2^2-y_2^3)) \right \}
\end{align}$$

=== Doubling ===
Given a point $P_1=(x_1,y_1)$ on $T_{a}$, the point $P_3=(x_3,y_3)=2P_1$ has coordinates:

$$\begin{align}
x_3 &= \frac{9}{4y_1^2 x_1^4}+\frac{9}{y_1^2ax_1^3}+ \left (\frac{9}{y_1^2a^2}+\frac{9}{y_1^2a} \right )x_1^2+ \left (\frac{18}{y_1^2a^2}-2 \right ) x_1+\frac{9}{y_1^2a^2-3a} \\
y_3 &= -\frac{27}{8y_1^3x_1^6}-\frac{81}{4y_1^3ax_1^5}+ \left (-\frac{81}{2y_1^3a^2}-\frac{81}{4y_1^3a} \right )x_1^4+ \left (-\frac{27}{y_1^3a^3}-\frac{81}{y_1^3a^2}+\frac{9}{2y_1} \right )x_1^3+ \left (-\frac{81}{y_1^3a^3}-\frac{81}{2y_1^3}a^2+\frac{27}{2y_1a} \right)x_1^2 \\
& \qquad \qquad \qquad \qquad+ \left (-\frac{81}{y_1^3a^3}+\frac{9}{y_1a^2}+\frac{9}{y_1a} \right )x_1 + \left (-\frac{27}{y_1^3a^3}+\frac{9}{y_1a^2}-y_1 \right )
\end{align}$$

=== Negation ===
Given a point $P_1=(x_1,y_1)$ on $T_{a}$, its negation with respect to the neutral element $(0:1:0)$ is $-P_1=(x_1,-y_1)$.

There are also other formulas given in for Tripling-oriented Doche–Icart–Kohel curves for fast tripling operation and mixed-addition.

== New Jacobian coordinates ==
For computing on these curves points are usually represented in new Jacobian coordinates (J^{n}):

a point in the new Jacobian coordinates is of the form $P=(X : Y : Z : Z^2)$; moreover:

$$P= (X:Y:Z:Z^{2}) = (\lambda^{2}X:\lambda^{3}Y:\lambda Z:\lambda^{2}Z^{2}),$$

for any $\lambda \in K$.

This means, for example, that the point $P=(X:Y:Z:Z^2)$ and the point $Q=(4X:8Y:2Z:4Z^2)$ (for $\lambda=2$) are actually the same.

So, an affine point $P=(x,y)$ on $T_{a}$ is written in the new Jacobian coordinates as $P=(X : Y : Z : Z^2)$, where $x = X/Z^2$ and $y = Y/Z^3$; in this way, the equation for $T_{a}$ becomes:

$$T_a\  :\  Y^2 = X^3 + 3aZ^2(X+Z^2)^2.$$

The term $Z^2$ of a point on the curve makes the mixed addition (that is the addition between two points in different systems of coordinates) more efficient.

The neutral element in new Jacobian coordinates is $(1:1:0:0)$.

== Algorithms and examples ==
=== Addition ===
The following algorithm represents the sum of two points $P_1$ and $P_2$ on an elliptic curve in the Tripling-oriented Doche-Icart-Kohel form. The result is a point $P_3=(X_3,Y_3,Z_3,ZZ_3)$. It is assumed that $Z_2=1$ and that $a_3=3a$. The cost of this implementation is 7M + 4S + 1*a3 + 10add + 3*2 + 1*4, where M indicates the multiplications, S the squarings, a3 indicates the multiplication by the constant a_{3}, add represents the number of additions required.

$A = X_2ZZ_1$

$B = Y_2ZZ_1Z_1$

$C = X_1-A$

$D = 2(Y_1-B)$

$F = C^2$

$F_4 = 4F$

$Z_3 = (Z_1+C)^2-ZZ_1-F$

$E = {Z_3}^2$

$G = CF_4$

$H = AF_4$

$X_3 = D^2-G-2H-a_3E$

$Y_3 = D(H-X_3)-2BG$

$ZZ_3 = E$

==== Example ====
Let $P_1=(1,\sqrt{13})$ and $P_2=(0,\sqrt{3})$ affine points on the elliptic curve over $\mathbb{R}$:

$y^2 = x^3 +3(x+1)^2$.

Then:

$A = X_2ZZ_1 = 0$

$B = Y_2ZZ_1Z_1 = \sqrt{3}$

$C = X_1-A = 1$

$D = 2(Y_1-B) = 2(\sqrt{13}-\sqrt{3})$

$F = C^2 = 1$

$F_4 = 4F = 4$

$Z_3 = (Z_1+C)^2-ZZ_1-F = 2$

$E = {Z_3}^2 = 4$

$G = CF_4 = 4$

$H = AF_4 = 0$

$X_3 = D^2-G-2H-a_3E = 48-8\sqrt{39}$

$Y_3 = D(H-X_3)-2BG = 296\sqrt{3}-144\sqrt{13}$

$ZZ_3 = E = 4$

Notice that in this case $Z_1=Z_2=1$. The resulting point is $P_3 = (X_3,Y_3,Z_3,ZZ_3) = (48-8\sqrt{39},296\sqrt{3}-144\sqrt{13},2,4)$, that in affine coordinates is $P_3=(12-2\sqrt{39},37\sqrt{3}-18\sqrt{13})$.

=== Doubling ===
The following algorithm represents the doubling of a point $P_1$ on an elliptic curve in the Tripling-oriented Doche-Icart-Kohel form. It is assumed that $a_3=3a$, $a_2=2a$. The cost of this implementation is 2M + 7S + 1*a2 + 1*a3 + 12add + 2*2 + 1*3 + 1*8; here M represents the multiplications, S the squarings, a2 and a3 indicates the multiplications by the constants a_{2} and a_{3} respectively, and add indicates the additions.

$A = {X_1}^2$

$B = a_2ZZ_1(X_1+ZZ_1)$

$C = 3(A+B)$

$D = {Y_1}^2$

$E = D^2$

$Z_3 = (Y_1+Z_1)^2-D-ZZ_1$

$ZZ_3 = Z_3^2$

$F = 2((X_1+D)^2-A-E)$

$X_3 = C^2-a_3ZZ_3-2F$

$Y_3 = C(F-X_3)-8E$

==== Example ====
Let $P_1=(0,\sqrt{3})$ be a point on $y^2 = x^3 + 3(x+1)^2$.

Then:

$A = {X_1}^2 = 0$

$B = a_2ZZ_1(X_1+ZZ_1) = 2$

$C = 3(A+B) = 6$

$D = {Y_1}^2 = 3$

$E = D^2 = 9$

$Z_3 = (Y_1+Z_1)^2-D-ZZ_1 = 2\sqrt{3}$

$ZZ_3 = Z_3^2 = 12$

$F = 2((X_1+D)^2-A-E) = 0$

$X_3 = C^2-a_3ZZ_3-2F = 0$

$Y_3 = C(F-X_3)-8E = -72$

Notice that here the point is in affine coordinates, so $Z_1=1$. The resulting point is $P_3=(0,-72,2\sqrt{3},12)$, that in affine coordinates is $P_3 = (0,-\sqrt{3})$.

== Equivalence with Weierstrass form ==
Any elliptic curve is birationally equivalent to another written in the Weierstrass form.

The following twisted tripling-oriented Doche-Icart-Kohel curve:

$$T_{a,\lambda}: \quad y^2 = x^3 + 3\lambda a(x+\lambda)^2$$

can be transformed into the Weierstrass form by the map:

$$(x,y)\mapsto (x-\lambda a, y).$$

In this way $T_{a,\lambda}$ becomes:

$$y^2 = x^3 - 3{\lambda}^2a(a-2)x + {\lambda}^3a(2a^2-6a+3)$$.

Conversely, given an elliptic curve in the Weierstrass form:

$$E_{c,d}: \quad y^2 = x^3 +cx^2 +d$$,

it is possible to find the "corresponding" Tripling-oriented Doche–Icart–Kohel curve, using the following relation:

$$\lambda = \frac{-3d(a-2)}{a(2a^2-6a+3)}$$

where a is a root of the polynomial

$$6912a(a-2)^3-j(4a-9),$$

where

$$j=\frac{6912c^3}{4c^3+27d^2}$$

is the j-invariant of the elliptic curve $E_{c,d}$.

Notice that in this case the map given is not only a birational equivalence, but an isomorphism between curves.

== See also ==
- Table of costs of operations in elliptic curves
