= Jacobian curve =

In mathematics, the Jacobi curve is a representation of an elliptic curve different from the usual one defined by the Weierstrass equation. Sometimes it is used in cryptography instead of the Weierstrass form because it can provide a defence against simple and differential power analysis style (SPA) attacks; it is possible, indeed, to use the general addition formula also for doubling a point on an elliptic curve of this form: in this way the two operations become indistinguishable from some side-channel information. The Jacobi curve also offers faster arithmetic compared to the Weierstrass curve.

The Jacobi curve can be of two types: the Jacobi intersection, that is given by an intersection of two surfaces, and the Jacobi quartic.

== Elliptic Curves: Basics ==
Given an elliptic curve, it is possible to do some "operations" between its points: for example one can add two points P and Q obtaining the point P + Q that belongs to the curve; given a point P on the elliptic curve, it is possible to "double" P, that means find [2]P = P + P (the square brackets are used to indicate [n]P, the point P added n times), and also find the negation of P, that means find –P. In this way, the points of an elliptic curve forms a group. Note that the identity element of the group operation is not a point on the affine plane, it only appears in the projective coordinates: then O = (0: 1: 0) is the "point at infinity", that is the neutral element in the group law. Adding and doubling formulas are useful also to compute [n]P, the n-th multiple of a point P on an elliptic curve: this operation is considered the most in elliptic curve cryptography.

An elliptic curve E, over a field K can be put in the Weierstrass form y^{2} = x^{3} + ax + b, with a, b in K. What will be of importance later are point of order 2, that is P on E such that [2]P = O and P ≠ O. If P = (p, 0) is a point on E, then it has order 2; more generally the points of order 2 correspond to the roots of the polynomial f(x) = x^{3} + ax + b.

From now on, we will use E_{a,b} to denote the elliptic curve with Weierstrass form y^{2} = x^{3} + ax + b.

If E_{a,b} is such that the cubic polynomial x^{3} + ax + b has three distinct roots in K and b = 0 we can write E_{a,b} in the Legendre normal form:

E_{a,b}: y^{2} = x(x + 1)(x + j)

In this case we have three points of order two: (0, 0), (–1, 0), (–j, 0). In this case we use the notation E[j]. Note that j can be expressed in terms of a, b.

== Definition: Jacobi intersection ==
An elliptic curve in P^{3}(K) can be represented as the intersection of two quadric surfaces:

$$Q: \{Q_1(X_0,X_1,X_2,X_3)=0\} \cap \{Q_2(X_0,X_1,X_2,X_3)=0\}$$

It is possible to define the Jacobi form of an elliptic curve as the intersection of two quadrics. Let E_{a,b} be an elliptic curve in the Weierstrass form, we apply the following map to it:

$$\Phi: (x,y) \mapsto (X,Y,Z,T) = (x,y,1,x^2)$$

We see that the following system of equations holds:

$$\mathbf S: \begin{cases}
X^2-TZ=0\\
Y^2-aXZ-bZ^2-TX=0
\end{cases}$$

The curve E[j] corresponds to the following intersection of surfaces in P^{3}(K):

$$\mathbf S1:
\begin{cases}
X^2+Y^2-T^2=0\\
kX^2+Z^2-T^2=0
\end{cases}$$.

The "special case", E[0], the elliptic curve has a double point and thus it is singular.

S1 is obtained by applying to E[j] the transformation:

ψ: E[j] → S1
$$(x,y) \mapsto (X,Y,Z,T)=(-2y,x^2-j,x^2+2jx+j,x^2+2x+j)$$
$$O=(0:1:0) \mapsto (0,1,1,1)$$

=== Group law ===
For S1, the neutral element of the group is the point (0, 1, 1, 1), that is the image of O = (0: 1: 0) under ψ.

==== Addition and doubling ====
Given P_{1} = (X_{1}, Y_{1}, Z_{1}, T_{1}) and P_{2} = (X_{2}, Y_{2}, Z_{2}, T_{2}), two points on S1, the coordinates of the point P_{3} = P_{1} + P_{2} are:

$$X_3 = T_1Y_2X_1Z_2  +  Z_1X_2Y_1T_2$$
$$Y_3 = T_1Y_2Y_1T_2  -   Z_1X_2X_1Z_2$$
$$Z_3 = T_1Z_1T_2Z_2  -   kX_1Y_1X_2Y_2$$
$$T_3 = (T_1Y_2)^2  +  (Z_1X_2)^2$$

These formulas are also valid for doubling: it sufficies to have P_{1} = P_{2}. So adding or doubling points in S1 are operations that both require 16 multiplications plus one multiplication by a constant (k).

It is also possible to use the following formulas for doubling the point P_{1} and find P_{3} = [2]P_{1}:

$$X_3 = 2Y_1T_1Z_1X_1$$
$$Y_3 = (T_1Y_1)^2 - (T_1Z_1)^2 + (Z_1Y_1)^2$$
$$Z_3  = (T_1Z_1)^2 - (T_1Y_1)^2 + (Z_1Y_1)^2$$
$$T_3  = (T_1Z_1)^2 + (T_1Y_1)^2 - (Z_1Y_1)^2$$

Using these formulas 8 multiplications are needed to double a point. However, there are even more efficient “strategies” for doubling that require only 7 multiplications. In this way it is possible to triple a point with 23 multiplications; indeed [3]P_{1} can be obtained by adding P_{1} with [2]P_{1} with a cost of 7 multiplications for [2]P_{1} and 16 for P_{1} + [2]P_{1}

==== Example of addition and doubling ====
Let K = R or C and consider the case:

$$\mathbf S1:
\begin{cases}
X^2+Y^2-T^2=0\\
4X^2+Z^2-T^2=0
\end{cases}$$

Consider the points $P_1=(1,\sqrt{3},0,2)$ and $P_2=(1,2,1,\sqrt{5})$: it is easy to verify that P_{1} and P_{2} belong to S1 (it is sufficient to see that these points satisfy both equations of the system S1).

Using the formulas given above for adding two points, the coordinates for P_{3}, where P_{3} = P_{1} + P_{2} are:

$$X_3 = T_1Y_2X_1Z_2  +  Z_1X_2Y_1T_2 = 4$$
$$Y_3 = T_1Y_2Y_1T_2  -   Z_1X_2X_1Z_2 = 4\sqrt{15}$$
$$Z_3 = T_1Z_1T_2Z_2  -   kX_1Y_1X_2Y_2 = -8\sqrt{3}$$
$$T_3 = (T_1Y_2)^2  +  (Z_1X_2)^2 = 16$$

The resulting point is $P_3=(4,4\sqrt{15},-8\sqrt{3},16)$.

With the formulas given above for doubling, it is possible to find the point P_{3} = [2]P_{1}:

$$X_3 = 2Y_1T_1Z_1X_1 = 0$$
$$Y_3 = (T_1Y_1)^2 - (T_1Z_1)^2 + (Z_1Y_1)^2 = 12$$
$$Z_3  = (T_1Z_1)^2 - (T_1Y_1)^2 + (Z_1Y_1)^2 = -12$$
$$T_3  = (T_1Z_1)^2 + (T_1Y_1)^2 - (Z_1Y_1)^2 = 12$$

So, in this case P_{3} = [2]P_{1} = (0, 12, –12, 12).

==== Negation ====
Given the point P_{1} = (X_{1}, Y_{1}, Z_{1}, T_{1}) in S1, its negation is −P_{1} = (−X_{1}, Y_{1}, Z_{1}, T_{1})

==== Addition and doubling in affine coordinates ====
Given two affine points P_{1} = (x_{1}, y_{1}, z_{1}) and P_{2} = (x_{2}, y_{2}, z_{2}), their sum is a point P_{3} with coordinates:

$$x_3 = \frac{y_2x_1z_2 + z_1x_2y_1}{(y_2^2 + (z_1x_2)^2)}$$
$$y_3 = \frac{y_2y_1-z_1x_2x_1z_2}{(y_2^2+(z_1x_2)^2)}$$
$$z_3 = \frac{z_1z_2-ax_1y_1x_2y_2}{(y_2^2+(z_1x_2)^2)}$$

These formulas are valid also for doubling with the condition P_{1} = P_{2}.

==== Extended coordinates ====
There is another kind of coordinate system with which a point in the Jacobi intersection can be represented. Given the following elliptic curve in the Jacobi intersection form:

$$\mathbf S1:
\begin{cases}
x^2+y^2=1\\
kx^2+z^2=1
\end{cases}$$

the extended coordinates describe a point P = (x, y, z) with the variables X, Y, Z, T, XY, ZT, where:

$$x = X/T$$
$$y = Y/T$$
$$z = Z/T$$
$$XY = X\cdot Y$$
$$ZT = Z\cdot T$$

Sometimes these coordinates are used, because they are more convenient (in terms of time-cost) in some specific situations. For more information about the operations based on the use of these coordinates see https://hyperelliptic.org/EFD/g1p/auto-jintersect-extended.html

== Definition: Jacobi quartic ==
A Jacobi quartic of equation $y^2=x^4-1.9x^2+1$

An elliptic curve in Jacobi quartic form can be obtained from the curve E_{a,b} in the Weierstrass form with at least one point of order 2. The following transformation f sends each point of E_{a,b} to a point in the Jacobi coordinates, where (X: Y: Z) = (sX: s^{2}Y: sZ).

f: E_{a,b} → J
$$(p,0) \mapsto (0:-1:1)$$
$$(x,y)\neq (p,0) \mapsto (2(x-p) : (2x+p)(x-p)^2- y^2: y)$$
$O \mapsto (0 :1 :1)$

Applying f to E_{a,b}, one obtains a curve in J of the following form:

$C :\ Y^2= eX^4-2dX^2Z^2+ Z^4$

where:

$$e=\frac{-( 3p^2+4a)}{16}, \ \ d=\frac{3p}{4}$$.

are elements in K. C represents an elliptic curve in the Jacobi quartic form, in Jacobi coordinates.

=== Jacobi quartic in affine coordinates ===
The general form of a Jacobi quartic curve in affine coordinates is:

$$y^2 = ex^4 + 2ax^2 + 1$$,

where often e = 1 is assumed.

=== Group law ===
The neutral element of the group law of C is the projective point (0: 1: 1).

==== Addition and doubling in affine coordinates ====
Given two affine points $P_1=(x_1,y_1)$ and $P_2=(x_2,y_2)$, their sum is a point $P_3=(x_3,y_3)$, such that:

$$x_3 = \frac{x_1y_2+y_1x_2}{1-e(x_1x_2)^2}$$
$$y_3 = \frac{((1+e(x_1x_2)^2)(y_1y_2+2ax_1x_2)+2ex_1x_2({x_1}^2+{x_2}^2))}{(1-e(x_1x_2)^2)^2}$$

As in the Jacobi intersections, also in this case it is possible to use this formula for doubling as well.

==== Addition and doubling in projective coordinates ====
Given two points P_{1} = (X_{1}: Y_{1}: Z_{1}) and P_{2} = (X_{2}: Y_{2}: Z_{2}) in C′, the coordinates for the point P_{3} = (X_{3}: Y_{3}: Z_{3}), where P_{3} = P_{1} + P_{2}, are given in terms of P_{1} and P_{2} by the formulae:

$$X_3 = X_1Z_1Y_2 + Y_1X_2Z_2$$
$$Y_3 = \left (Z_1^2 Z_2^2 + eX_1^2 X_2^2 \right) \left (Y_1Y_2-2aX_1X_2Z_1Z_2 \right ) \ + \ 2eX_1X_2Z_1Z_2 \left (X_1^2Z_2^2+Z_1^2X_2^2 \right )$$
$$Z_3 = Z_1^2 Z_2^2 - eX_1^2 X_2^2$$

One can use this formula also for doubling, with the condition that P_{2} = P_{1}: in this way the point P_{3} = P_{1} + P_{1} = [2]P_{1} is obtained.

The number of multiplications required to add two points is 13 plus 3 multiplications by constants: in particular there are two multiplications by the constant e and one by the constant a.

There are some "strategies" to reduce the operations required for adding and doubling points: the number of multiplications can be decreased to 11 plus 3 multiplications by constants (see section 3 for more details).

The number of multiplications can be reduced by working on the constants e and d: the elliptic curve in the Jacobi form can be modified in order to have a smaller number of operations for adding and doubling. So, for example, if the constant d in C is significantly small, the multiplication by d can be cancelled; however the best option is to reduce e: if it is small, not only one, but two multiplications are neglected.

==== Example of addition and doubling ====
Consider the elliptic curve E_{4,0}, it has a point P of order 2: P = (p, 0) = (0, 0). Therefore, a = 4, b = p = 0 so we have e = 1 and d = 1 and the associated Jacobi quartic form is:

$$C:\  Y^2 = X^4 + Z^4$$

Choosing two points $P_1=(1:\sqrt{2}:1)$ and $P_2=(2:\sqrt{17}:1)$, it is possible to find their sum P_{3} = P_{1} + P_{2} using the formulae for adding given above:

$$X_3 = 1\cdot1\cdot\sqrt{17} +  \sqrt{2}\cdot2\cdot1 = \sqrt{17} + 2\sqrt{2}$$
$$Y_3 = \left (1^2 \cdot 1^2 + 1\cdot 1^2 \cdot 2^2 \right ) \left (\sqrt{2}\cdot \sqrt{17}- 2\cdot 0 \cdot 1 \cdot 2\cdot  1\cdot1 \right ) + 2\cdot 1 \cdot 1 \cdot 2\cdot  1\cdot1 \left (1^2\cdot 1^2+ 1^2 \cdot 2^2 \right) = 5\sqrt{34} + 20$$
$$Z_3 = 1^2 \cdot 1^2 - 1\cdot 1^2 \cdot 2^2 = -3$$.

So

$$P_3=(\sqrt{17}+2\sqrt{2}:5\sqrt{34}+20:-3)$$.

Using the same formulae, the point P_{4} = [2]P_{1} is obtained:

$$X_3 = 1\cdot1\cdot\sqrt{2} + \sqrt{2}\cdot1\cdot1 = 2\sqrt{2}$$
$$Y_3 = \left (1+1\cdot1 \right)\left (\sqrt{2}\cdot\sqrt{2} - 2\cdot 0 \cdot 1 \cdot 1\cdot  1\cdot1 \right ) + 2\cdot1 \left (1^2 \cdot 1^2 + 1^2 \cdot 1^2 \right ) = 8$$
$$Z_3 = 1^2 \cdot 1^2 - 1 \cdot 1^2 \cdot 1^2 = 0$$

So

$$P_4=(2\sqrt{2}:8:0)$$.

==== Negation ====
The negation of a point P_{1} = (X_{1}: Y_{1}: Z_{1}) is: −P_{1} = (−X_{1}: Y_{1}: Z_{1})

=== Alternative coordinates for the Jacobi quartic ===
There are other systems of coordinates that can be used to represent a point in a Jacobi quartic: they are used to obtain fast computations in certain cases. For more information about the time-cost required in the operations with these coordinates see https://hyperelliptic.org/EFD/g1p/auto-jquartic.html

Given an affine Jacobi quartic

$$y^2 = x^4 + 2ax^2 + 1$$

the Doubling-oriented XXYZZ coordinates introduce an additional curve parameter c satisfying a^{2} + c^{2} = 1 and they represent a point (x, y) as (X, XX, Y, Z, ZZ, R), such that:

$$x = X/Z$$
$$y = Y/ZZ$$
$$XX = X^2$$
$$ZZ = Z^2$$
$$R = 2\cdot X\cdot Z$$

the Doubling-oriented XYZ coordinates, with the same additional assumption (a^{2} + c^{2} = 1), represent a point (x, y) with (X, Y, Z) satisfying the following equations:

$$x = X/Z$$
$$y = Y/Z^2$$

Using the XXYZZ coordinates there is no additional assumption, and they represent a point (x, y) as (X, XX, Y, Z, ZZ) such that:

$$x = X/Z$$
$$y = Y/ZZ$$
$$XX = X^2$$
$$ZZ = Z^2$$

while the XXYZZR coordinates represent (x, y) as (X, XX, Y, Z, ZZ, R) such that:

$$x = X/Z$$
$$y = Y/ZZ$$
$$XX = X^2$$
$$ZZ = Z^2$$
$$R = 2\cdot X\cdot Z$$

with the XYZ coordinates the point (x, y) is given by (X, Y, Z), with:

$$x = X/Z$$
$$y = Y/Z^2$$.

== See also ==
For more information about the running-time required in a specific case, see Table of costs of operations in elliptic curves.
