= Betty Rollin =

American journalist and author (1936–2023)

- Publicity Photo of Betty Rollin
- Born: January 3, 1936; New York City, New York, U.S.
- Died: November 7, 2023 (aged 87); Basel, Switzerland
- Education: Sarah Lawrence College
- Occupations: Journalist and author
- Spouse: Dr. Harold Edwards

Betty Rollin (January 3, 1936 – November 7, 2023) was an American journalist and author who was an NBC News correspondent. As a reporter, she won both the DuPont and Emmy awards, and she contributed reports for PBS. She also wrote two memoirs: First, You Cry, about her experiences with breast cancer, and Last Wish, about her mother having terminal cancer and helping her die through assisted suicide.

== Background ==
Rollin was born in New York City in 1936. She was a graduate of Fieldston Ethical Culture School and Sarah Lawrence College, where she was a classmate of Yoko Ono, as Ono mentioned on the Dick Cavett Show.

Rollin's first interest was acting; she studied under Sanford Meisner and Lee Strasberg and briefly worked in theatre. However, she soon pursued a career as a journalist instead. She wrote for Vogue in the mid-1960s and for Look from 1966 until its closure in 1971. Thereafter, she began a career in TV journalism, working for NBC News from the early 1970s until 1982, and for ABC News from 1982 to 1984. She also contributed to PBS's Religion and Ethics NewsWeekly for over a decade.

== Books ==
=== First, You Cry ===
Rollin was first diagnosed with breast cancer in 1975, and again in 1984, each time losing a breast to the disease. Rollin discussed her cancer publicly and wrote about it in the book, First, You Cry. to encourage public awareness and to give encouragement to others facing this disease. First You Cry, as it was titled, became a 1978 television movie starring Mary Tyler Moore as Rollin.

=== Last Wish ===
Rollin's mother Ida was diagnosed with terminal ovarian cancer in 1981, and Rollin helped her mother end her life in 1983. She revealed this in her book Last Wish, published in 1985 and republished in 1998. One critic called it "a document of personal compassion and public importance." The book has been published in 19 countries and was made into a TV movie in 1992 starring Patty Duke as Rollin and Maureen Stapleton as her mother.

After the book was published, Rollin was active in the death with dignity movement, and served on the advisory board of Compassion and Choices.

== Personal life and death ==
Rollin lived with her husband, mathematician Harold Edwards, in Manhattan until his death in 2020. They had no children. Rollin's health declined after her husband's death, and she died by assisted suicide at the Pegasos Swiss Association in Basel on November 14, 2023, at the age of 87.

== Books ==
- I Thee Wed (1961)
- Mothers Are Funnier Than Children (1964)
- First, You Cry (1976) ISBN 0-06-095630-5
- Last Wish (1985) ISBN 1-891620-01-0
- Am I Getting Paid for This?: A Romance About Work (1986) ISBN 0-451-14442-2
- Here's the Bright Side: Of Failure, Fear, Cancer, Divorce, and Other Bum Raps (2007) ISBN 978-1-4000-6565-3

== See also ==
- Betty Rollin website
- Death with Dignity National Center
