= First, You Cry =

- Genre: Biography; Drama
- Based on: First, You Cry by Betty Rollin
- Written by: Carmen Culver
- Directed by: George Schaefer
- Starring: Mary Tyler Moore; Anthony Perkins; Jennifer Warren; Richard Dysart; Don Johnson
- Music by: Peter Matz
- Country of origin: United States
- Original language: English

Production
- Producer: Philip Barry Jr.
- Production locations: New York City; CBS Studio Center - 4024 Radford Avenue, Studio City, Los Angeles, California
- Cinematography: Edward R. Brown
- Editor: James Galloway
- Running time: 100 minutes
- Production companies: Company Four; MTM Enterprises

Original release
- Network: CBS
- Release: November 8, 1978

First You Cry is a 1978 American made-for-television biographical drama film starring Mary Tyler Moore, Anthony Perkins, Jennifer Warren, Richard Dysart and Don Johnson, directed by George Schaefer. It is based on the 1976 autobiography First, You Cry written by NBC News correspondent Betty Rollin in which she recalls her battle with breast cancer. The film was broadcast on CBS on November 8, 1978.

== Synopsis ==
TV news correspondent Betty Rollin (Moore) is giving a television report on the dangers of breast cancer, hoping that it will make women more aware of preventative measures. At home, Betty's husband Arthur Heroz (Perkins), a successful author, comments on how a lump in Betty's left breast has grown appreciably harder since she had it examined some time ago. Betty promises to make a follow-up exam. The subsequent checkup, however, leads to a diagnosis of cancer. Following a period of fear and denial, Betty agrees to a biopsy, which, due to the cancer's spread, leads to an immediate mastectomy. Upon leaving the hospital, Betty tries to deal with her varied emotions, along with those of her self-involved spouse, former lover, mother and friends. When she can't perform simple tasks like putting on a robe, Betty falls into depression. She sees herself as "damaged goods", leading to dramatic intimacy issues with Arthur.

Betty returns to work, but feels only awkwardness with colleagues. Things worsen when Betty finally looks at her scar, and assumes that all men will now be repulsed by her body. When husband Arthur becomes increasingly distant, she reunites with former beau David (Crenna). She goes to live with him in Philadelphia, quitting her job and leaving her friends behind. After a period of bliss, however, Betty still finds herself unhappy. She then decides to write a book about her travails, leading to an overhaul of her life, both professionally and personally.

== Cast ==
- Mary Tyler Moore as Betty Rollin
- Anthony Perkins as Arthur Heroz
- Jennifer Warren as Erica Wells
- Richard Dysart as Dr. Brennerman
- Don Johnson as Daniel Easton
- Florence Eldridge as Mrs. Rollin
- Patricia Barry as Anne
- Antoinette Bower as Marsha
- Richard Crenna as David Towers
- Vivi Janiss as Martha

== Production ==
First You Cry was shot from February 14 to March 16, 1978: exterior scenes were filmed on location in New York City and interior scenes were filmed at CBS Studio Center in Studio City, California.

== Awards and nominations ==
| Year | Award | Category | Nominee(s) | Result | Ref. |
|---|---|---|---|---|---|
| 1979 | American Cinema Editors Awards | Best Edited Television Special | James Galloway | Nominated | |
| 1979 | Directors Guild of America Awards | Outstanding Directorial Achievement in Specials/Movies for TV/Actuality | George Schaefer | Nominated | |
| 1979 | Golden Globe Awards | Best Television Movie | | Nominated | |
| 1979 | Primetime Emmy Awards | Outstanding Drama or Comedy Special | Philip Barry, Jr. | Nominated | |
| 1979 | Primetime Emmy Awards | Outstanding Lead Actress in a Limited Series or a Special | Mary Tyler Moore | Nominated | |
| 1979 | Primetime Emmy Awards | Outstanding Film Editing for a Limited Series or Special | James Galloway | Nominated | |
| 1979 | Primetime Emmy Awards | Outstanding Music Composition for a Limited Series or a Special | Peter Matz | Nominated | |

== In popular culture ==
The film was parodied on the November 17, 1979 episode of Saturday Night Live hosted by Bea Arthur, in a sketch titled "First He Cries". In the sketch, a husband (played by Bill Murray) is distraught over his wife's (played by Gilda Radner) mastectomy. The sketch was controversial and received over 200 calls and 300 letters of complaint. Betty Rollin herself wrote a letter in support of the sketch.

== Home media ==
MTM Home Video released the film First, You Cry in 1993 on VHS tape. As of this posting, the telefilm has not been reissued on DVD.
