= J-line =

Mathematical concept

In the study of the arithmetic of elliptic curves, the j-line over a ring R is the coarse moduli scheme attached to the moduli problem sending a ring $R$ to the set of isomorphism classes of elliptic curves over $R$. Since elliptic curves over the complex numbers are isomorphic (over an algebraic closure) if and only if their $j$-invariants agree, the affine space $\mathbb{A}^1_j$ parameterizing j-invariants of elliptic curves yields a coarse moduli space. However, this fails to be a fine moduli space due to the presence of elliptic curves with automorphisms, necessitating the construction of the Moduli stack of elliptic curves.

This is related to the congruence subgroup $\Gamma(1)$ in the following way:

$$M([\Gamma(1)]) = \mathrm{Spec}(R[j])$$

Here the j-invariant is normalized such that $j=0$ has complex multiplication by $\mathbb{Z}[\zeta_3]$, and $j=1728$ has complex multiplication by $\mathbb{Z}[i]$.

The j-line can be seen as giving a coordinatization of the classical modular curve of level 1, $X_0(1)$, which is isomorphic to the complex projective line $\mathbb{P}^1_{/\mathbb{C}}$.
