= Montgomery curve =

Type of elliptic curve

In mathematics, the Montgomery curve is a form of elliptic curve introduced by Peter L. Montgomery in 1987, different from the usual Weierstrass form. It is used for certain computations, and in particular in different cryptography applications.

== Definition ==
A Montgomery curve of equation $\frac{1}{4}y^2=x^3+\frac{5}{2}x^2+x$

A Montgomery curve over a field K is defined by the equation

$$M_{A,B}: By^2 = x^3 + Ax^2 + x$$

for A, B ∈ K such that B(A^{2} − 4) ≠ 0.

Generally this curve is considered over a finite field K (for example, over a finite field of q elements, K = F_{q}) with characteristic different from 2 and with A ≠ ±2 and B ≠ 0. Over such fields, the group order of the curve is always divisible by 4. Montgomery curves are also considered over the rationals with the same restrictions for A and B.

Every Montgomery curve has a point at $(0,0)$.

== Montgomery arithmetic ==
It is possible to do some "operations" between the points of an elliptic curve: "adding" two points $P, Q$ consists of finding a third one $R$ such that $R=P+Q$; "doubling" a point consists of computing $[2]P=P+P$ (For more information about operations see The group law) and below.

A point $P=(x,y)$ on the elliptic curve in the Montgomery form $By^2 = x^3 + Ax^2 + x$ can be represented in Montgomery coordinates $P=(X:Z)$, where $P=(X:Z)$ are projective coordinates and $x=X/Z$ for $Z\ne 0$.

Notice that this kind of representation for a point loses information: indeed, in this case, there is no distinction between the affine points $(x,y)$ and $(x,-y)$ because they are both given by the point $(X:Z)$. However, with this representation it is possible to obtain multiples of points, that is, given $P=(X:Z)$, to compute $[n]P=(X_n:Z_n)$.

Now, considering the two points $P_n=[n]P=(X_n:Z_n)$ and $P_m=[m]P=(X_m:Z_m)$: their sum is given by the point $P_{m+n}=P_m+P_n = (X_{m+n}:Z_{m+n})$ whose coordinates are:

$$X_{m+n} = Z_{m-n}((X_m-Z_m)(X_n+Z_n)+(X_m+Z_m)(X_n-Z_n))^2$$

$$Z_{m+n} = X_{m-n}((X_m-Z_m)(X_n+Z_n)-(X_m+Z_m)(X_n-Z_n))^2$$

If $m=n$, then the operation becomes a "doubling"; the coordinates of $[2]P_n=P_n+P_n=P_{2n}=(X_{2n}:Z_{2n})$ are given by the following equations:

$$4X_nZ_n = (X_n+Z_n)^2 - (X_n-Z_n)^2$$

$$X_{2n} = (X_n+Z_n)^2(X_n-Z_n)^2$$

$$Z_{2n} = (4X_nZ_n)((X_n-Z_n)^2+((A+2)/4)(4X_nZ_n))$$

The first operation considered above (addition) has a time-cost of 3M+2S, where M denotes the multiplication between two general elements of the field on which the elliptic curve is defined, while S denotes squaring of a general element of the field.

The second operation (doubling) has a time-cost of 2M + 2S + 1D, where D denotes the multiplication of a general element by a constant; notice that the constant is $(A+2)/4$, so $A$ can be chosen in order to have a small D.

== Algorithm and example ==
The following algorithm represents a doubling of a point $P_1=(X_1:Z_1)$ on an elliptic curve in the Montgomery form.

It is assumed that $Z_1=1$. The cost of this implementation is 1M + 2S + 1*A + 3add + 1*4. Here M denotes the multiplications required, S indicates the squarings, and a refers to the multiplication by A.

$$XX_1 = X_1^2 \,$$

$$X_2 = (XX_1-1)^2 \,$$

$$Z_2 = 4X_1(XX_1+aX_1+1) \,$$

=== Example ===
Let $P_1=(2,\sqrt{3})$ be a point on the curve $2y^2 = x^3 -x^2 + x$. In coordinates $(X_1:Z_1)$, with $x_1=X_1/Z_1$, $P_1=(2:1)$.

Then:

$$XX_1 = X_1^2 = 4 \,$$

$$X_2 = (XX_1-1)^2 = 9 \,$$

$$Z_2 = 4X_1(XX_1+AX_1+1) = 24 \,$$

The result is the point $P_2=(X_2:Z_2)=(9:24)$ such that $P_2=2P_1$.

== Addition ==
Given two points $P_1=(x_1,y_1)$, $P_2=(x_2,y_2)$ on the Montgomery curve $M_{A,B}$ in affine coordinates, the point $P_3=P_1+P_2$ represents, geometrically the third point of intersection between $M_{A,B}$ and the line passing through $P_1$ and $P_2$. It is possible to find the coordinates $(x_3,y_3)$ of $P_3$, in the following way:

1) consider a generic line $~y=lx+m$ in the affine plane and let it pass through $P_1$ and $P_2$ (impose the condition), in this way, one obtains $l=\frac{y_2-y_1}{x_2-x_1}$ and $m=y_1-\left(\frac{y_2-y_1}{x_2-x_1}\right)x_1$;

2) intersect the line with the curve $M_{A,B}$, substituting the $~y$ variable in the curve equation with $~y=lx+m$; the following equation of third degree is obtained:

$$x^3+(A-Bl^2)x^2+(1-2Blm)x-Bm^2=0.$$

As it has been observed before, this equation has three solutions that correspond to the $~x$ coordinates of $P_1$, $P_2$ and $P_3$. In particular this equation can be re-written as:

$$(x-x_1)(x-x_2)(x-x_3)=0$$

3) Comparing the coefficients of the two identical equations given above, in particular the coefficients of the terms of second degree, one gets:

$$-x_1-x_2-x_3=A-Bl^2$$.

So, $x_3$ can be written in terms of $x_1$, $y_1$, $x_2$, $y_2$, as:

$$x_3 = B\left(\frac{y_2-y_1}{x_2-x_1}\right)^2-A-x_1-x_2.$$

4) To find the $~y$ coordinate of the point $P_3$ it is sufficient to substitute the value $x_3$ in the line $~y=lx+m$. Notice that this will not give the point $P_3$ directly. Indeed, with this method one find the coordinates of the point $~R$ such that $R+P_1+P_2=P_\infty$, but if one needs the resulting point of the sum between $P_1$ and $P_2$, then it is necessary to observe that: $R+P_1+P_2=P_\infty$ if and only if $-R=P_1+P_2$. So, given the point $~R$, it is necessary to find $~-R$, but this can be done easily by changing the sign to the $~y$ coordinate of $~R$. In other words, it will be necessary to change the sign of the $~y$ coordinate obtained by substituting the value $x_3$ in the equation of the line.

Resuming, the coordinates of the point $P_3=(x_3,y_3)$, $P_3=P_1+P_2$ are:

$$x_3 = \frac{B(y_2-y_1)^2}{(x_2-x_1)^2}-A-x_1-x_2$$

$$y_3 = \frac{(2x_1+x_2+A)(y_2-y_1)}{x_2-x_1}-\frac{B(y_2-y_1)^3}{(x_2-x_1)^3}-y_1$$

== Doubling ==
Given a point $P_1$ on the Montgomery curve $M_{A,B}$, the point $[2]P_1$ represents geometrically the third point of intersection between the curve and the line tangent to $P_1$; so, to find the coordinates of the point $P_3=2P_1$ it is sufficient to follow the same method given in the addition formula; however, in this case, the line y = lx + m has to be tangent to the curve at $P_1$, so, if $M_{A,B}: f(x,y)=0$ with

$$f(x,y)=x^3+Ax^2+x-By^2,$$

then the value of l, which represents the slope of the line, is given by:

$$l=-\left.\frac{\partial f}{\partial x}\right/\frac{\partial f}{\partial y }$$

by the implicit function theorem.

So $l = \frac{3x_1^2 + 2Ax_1 + 1}{2By_1}$ and the coordinates of the point $P_3$, $P_3=2P_1$ are:

$$\begin{align}
x_3 & = Bl^2-A-x_1-x_1 = \frac{B(3x_1^2+2Ax_1+1)^2}{(2By_1)^2}-A-x_1-x_1 \\
y_3 & = (2x_1+x_1+A)l-Bl^3-y_1 \\
& = \frac{(2x_1+x_1+A)(3{x_1}^2+2Ax_1+1)}{2By_1}-\frac{B(3{x_1}^2+2Ax_1+1)^3}{(2By_1)^3}-y_1.
\end{align}$$

== Equivalence with twisted Edwards curves ==
Let $K$ be a field with characteristic different from 2.

Let $M_{A,B}$ be an elliptic curve in the Montgomery form:

$$M_{A,B} : Bv^2 = u^3 + Au^2 + u$$

with $A\in K\smallsetminus\{-2,2\}$, $B \in K\smallsetminus\{0\}$

and let $E_{a,d}$ be an elliptic curve in the twisted Edwards form:

$$E_{a,d}\  :\  ax^2 + y^2 = 1 + dx^2y^2, \,$$

with $a,d\in K\smallsetminus\{0\}, \quad a\neq d.$

The following theorem shows the birational equivalence between Montgomery curves and twisted Edwards curve:

Theorem (i) Every twisted Edwards curve is birationally equivalent to a Montgomery curve over $K$. In particular, the twisted Edwards curve $E_{a,d}$ is birationally equivalent to the Montgomery curve $M_{A,B}$ where $A = \frac{2(a+d)}{a-d}$, and $B = \frac{4}{a-d}$.

The map:

$$\psi\,:\,E_{a,d} \rightarrow M_{A,B}$$

$$(x,y) \mapsto (u,v) = \left(\frac{1+y}{1-y},\frac{1+y}{(1-y)x}\right)$$

is a birational equivalence from $E_{a,d}$ to $M_{A,B}$, with inverse:

$\psi^{-1}$: $M_{A,B} \rightarrow E_{a,d}$

$$(u,v) \mapsto (x,y) = \left(\frac{u}{v},\frac{u-1}{u+1}\right),
a=\frac{A+2}{B}, d=\frac{A-2}{B}$$

Notice that this equivalence between the two curves is not valid everywhere: indeed the map $\psi$ is not defined at the points $v = 0$ or $u + 1 = 0$ of the $M_{A,B}$.

== Equivalence with Weierstrass curves ==
Any elliptic curve can be written in Weierstrass form. In particular, the elliptic curve in the Montgomery form

$M_{A,B}$: $By^2 = x^3 + Ax^2 + x,$

can be transformed in the following way: divide each term of the equation for $M_{A,B}$ by $B^3$, and substitute the variables x and y, with $u=\frac{x}{B}$ and $v=\frac{y}{B}$ respectively, to get the equation

$$v^2 = u^3 + \frac{A}{B}u^2 + \frac{1}{B^2}u.$$

To obtain a short Weierstrass form from here, it is sufficient to replace u with the variable $t-\frac{A}{3B}$:

$$v^2 = \left(t-\frac{A}{3B}\right)^3 + \frac{A}{B}\left(t-\frac{A}{3B}\right)^2 + \frac{1}{B^2}\left(t-\frac{A}{3B}\right);$$

finally, this gives the equation:

$$v^2 = t^3 + \left(\frac{3-A^2}{3B^2}\right)t + \left(\frac{2A^3-9A}{27B^3}\right).$$

Hence the mapping is given as

$\psi$: $M_{A,B} \rightarrow E_{a,b}$

$$(x,y) \mapsto (t,v) = \left(\frac{x}{B} + \frac{A}{3B}, \frac{y}{B}\right),
a=\frac{3-A^2}{3B^2}, b=\frac{2A^3-9A}{27B^3}$$

In contrast, an elliptic curve over base field $\mathbb{F}$ in Weierstrass form

$E_{a,b}$: $v^2 = t^3 + at + b$

can be converted to Montgomery form if and only if $E_{a,b}$ satisfies the following conditions:

1. $z^3 + az + b = 0$ has at least one root $\alpha \in \mathbb{F}$; and
2. $3\alpha^2 + a$ is a quadratic residue in $\mathbb{F}$.

When these conditions are satisfied, then for $s = (\sqrt{3\alpha^2 + a})^{-1}$ we have the mapping

$\psi^{-1}$: $E_{a,b} \rightarrow M_{A,B}$

$$(t,v) \mapsto (x,y) =
\left(s (t-\alpha), s v\right),
A = 3 \alpha s,
B = s$$.

== See also ==
- Curve25519
- Table of costs of operations in elliptic curves – information about the running-time required in a specific case
