= Tanja Lange =

German cryptographer and mathematician

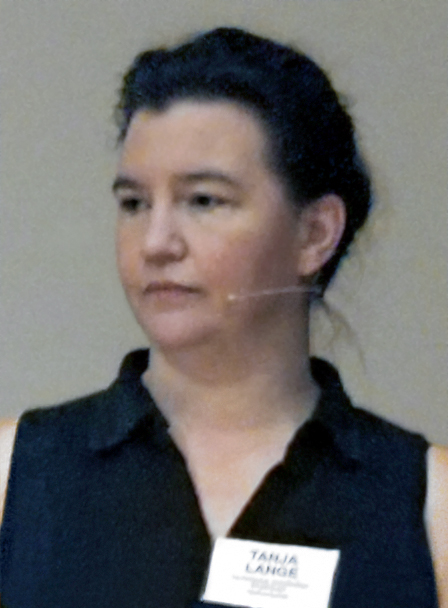
Tanja Lange at 30C3, 2013

Tanja Lange is a German cryptographer and number theorist at the Eindhoven University of Technology. She is known for her research on post-quantum cryptography.

== Education and career ==
Lange earned a diploma in mathematics in 1998 from the Technical University of Braunschweig. She completed her Ph.D. in 2001 at the Universität Duisburg-Essen. Her dissertation, jointly supervised by Gerhard Frey and YoungJu Choie, concerned Efficient Arithmetic on Hyperelliptic Curves.

After postdoctoral studies at Ruhr University Bochum, she became an associate professor at the Technical University of Denmark in 2005. She moved to the Eindhoven University of Technology as a full professor in 2007.

At Eindhoven, she chairs the coding theory and cryptology group and is scientific director of the Eindhoven Institute for the Protection of Systems and Information. She is also the coordinator of PQCRYPTO, a European multi-university consortium to make electronic communications future-proof against threats such as quantum factorization. She is one of the main authors of The Handbook of Elliptic and Hyperelliptic Curve Cryptography, published in 2005.

== See also ==
- NaCl, a cryptography software library developed by Lange and others
