= FourQ =

- Developer(s): Microsoft Research
- Initial release: 2015; 10 years ago
- Stable release: v3.1
- Repository: github.com/microsoft/FourQlib
- Written in: C
- Operating system: Windows 10, Linux
- Platform: IA-32, x86-64, ARM32, ARM64
- Type: Elliptic-curve cryptographic library
- License: MIT License
- Website: www.microsoft.com/en-us/research/project/fourqlib/

In cryptography, FourQ is an elliptic curve developed by Microsoft Research. It is designed for key agreements schemes (elliptic-curve Diffie–Hellman) and digital signatures (Schnorr), and offers about 128 bits of security. It is equipped with a reference implementation made by the authors of the original paper. The open source implementation is called FourQlib and runs on Windows and Linux and is available for x86, x64, and ARM. It is licensed under the MIT License and the source code is available on GitHub.

Its name is derived from the four dimensional Gallant–Lambert–Vanstone scalar multiplication, which allows high performance calculations. The curve is defined over a two dimensional extension of the prime field defined by the Mersenne prime $2^{127} - 1$.

== History ==
The curve was published in 2015 by Craig Costello and Patrick Longa from Microsoft Research on ePrint.

The paper was presented in Asiacrypt in 2015 in Auckland, New Zealand, and consequently a reference implementation was published on Microsoft's website.

There were some efforts to standardize usage of the curve under IETF; these efforts were withdrawn in late 2017.

== Mathematical properties ==
The curve is defined by a twisted Edwards equation

$$-x^2 + y^2 = 1 + d x^2 y^2$$

$d$ is a non-square in $\mathbb{F}_{p^2}$, where $p$ is the Mersenne prime $2^{127}-1$.

In order to avoid small subgroup attacks, all points are verified to lie in an N-torsion subgroup of the elliptic curve, where N is specified as a 246-bit prime dividing the order of the group.

The curve is equipped with two nontrivial endomorphisms: $\psi$ related to the $p$-power Frobenius map, and $\phi$, a low degree efficiently computable endomorphism (see complex multiplication).

== Cryptographic properties ==
=== Security ===
The currently best known discrete logarithm attack is the generic Pollard's rho algorithm, requiring about $2^{122.5}$ group operations on average. Therefore, it typically belongs to the 128 bit security level.

In order to prevent timing attacks, all group operations are done in constant time, i.e. without disclosing information about key material.

=== Efficiency ===
Most cryptographic primitives, and most notably ECDH, require fast computation of scalar multiplication, i.e. $[k]P$ for a point $P$ on the curve and an integer $k$, which is usually thought as distributed uniformly at random over $\{0, \ldots, N-1\}$.

Since we look at a prime order cyclic subgroup, one can write scalars $\lambda_\psi, \lambda_\phi$ such that $\psi(P) = [\lambda_\psi]P$ and $\phi(P) = [\lambda_\phi]P$ for every point $P$ in the N-torsion subgroup.

Hence, for a given $k$ we may write

$$k = a_1 + a_2 \lambda_\phi + a_3 \lambda_\psi + a_4 \lambda_\phi\lambda_\psi \pmod N$$

If we find small $a_i$, we may compute $[k]P$ quickly by utilizing the implied equation

$$[k]P = [a_1]P + [a_2] \phi(P) + [a_3] \psi(P) + [a_4] \phi(\psi(P))$$

Babai rounding technique is used to find small $a_i$. For FourQ it turns that one can guarantee an efficiently computable solution with $a_i < 2^{64}$.

Moreover, as the characteristic of the field is a Mersenne prime, modulations can be carried efficiently.

Both properties (four dimensional decomposition and Mersenne prime characteristic), alongside usage of fast multiplication formulae (extended twisted Edwards coordinates), make FourQ the currently fastest elliptic curve for the 128 bit security level.

== Uses ==
FourQ is implemented in the cryptographic library CIRCL, published by Cloudflare.

== See also ==
- Elliptic-curve cryptography
- Curve25519
- Curve448
