= WNAF =

WNAF may refer to:

- w-ary non-adjacent form (wNAF) in mathematics
- Western part of the North Anatolian Fault in geology
- Willie Nelson & Friends – Stars & Guitars, a music album
- Former call sign of the radio station WPVD (AM)
