= Supersingular isogeny graph =

Class of expander graphs arising in computational number theory

In mathematics, the supersingular isogeny graphs are a class of expander graphs that arise in computational number theory and have been applied in elliptic-curve cryptography. Their vertices represent supersingular elliptic curves over finite fields and their edges represent isogenies between curves.

== Definition and properties ==
A supersingular isogeny graph is determined by choosing a large prime number $p$ and a small prime number $\ell$, and considering the class of all supersingular elliptic curves defined over the finite field $\mathbb{F}_{p^2}$. There are approximately $(p+1)/12$ such curves, each two of which can be related by isogenies. The vertices in the supersingular isogeny graph represent these curves (or more concretely, their j-invariants, elements of $\mathbb{F}_{p^2}$) and the edges represent isogenies of degree $\ell$ between two curves.

The supersingular isogeny graphs are $\ell+1$-regular graphs, meaning that each vertex has exactly $\ell+1$ neighbors. They were proven by Pizer to be Ramanujan graphs, graphs with optimal expansion properties for their degree. The proof is based on Pierre Deligne's proof of the Ramanujan–Petersson conjecture.

== Cryptographic applications ==
One proposal for a cryptographic hash function involves starting from a fixed vertex of a supersingular isogeny graph, using the bits of the binary representation of an input value to determine a sequence of edges to follow in a walk in the graph, and using the identity of the vertex reached at the end of the walk as the hash value for the input. The security of the proposed hashing scheme rests on the assumption that it is difficult to find paths in this graph that connect arbitrary pairs of vertices.

It has also been proposed to use walks in two supersingular isogeny graphs with the same vertex set but different edge sets (defined using different choices of the $\ell$ parameter) to develop a key exchange primitive analogous to Diffie–Hellman key exchange, called supersingular isogeny key exchange, suggested as a form of post-quantum cryptography. However, a leading variant of supersingular isogeny key exchange was broken in 2022 using non-quantum methods.
