= CNSA (disambiguation) =

CNSA is the China National Space Administration, the national space agency of China.

CNSA may also refer to:

== Organizations ==
- China National School of Administration, the former name of the Chinese Academy of Governance
- Comité National de Secours et d'Alimentation, a humanitarian organization in Belgium in World War I
- Canadian Nursing Students' Association; see Nursing in Canada
- California Nursing Student Association; see Golden West College
- Caisse nationale de solidarité pour l'autonomie the French National Solidarity Fund for Autonomy

== Other uses ==
- Commercial National Security Algorithm Suite, cryptographic algorithms promulgated by the US National Security Agency
