= P-384 =

Elliptic curve used in cryptography

P-384 is the elliptic curve currently specified in Commercial National Security Algorithm Suite for the ECDSA and ECDH algorithms, which use elliptic-curve cryptography. It is a 384-bit curve over a finite field of prime order approximately 394×10^{113}. (Note: p = 394020061963944792122790401001436138 0507973927046544666794829340424572177149 6870329047266088258938001861606973112319) Its binary representation has 384 bits, with a simple pattern. (Note: Explicitly: p = 1111111111111111111111111111111111111111111111111111111111111111 1111111111111111111111111111111111111111111111111111111111111111 1111111111111111111111111111111111111111111111111111111111111111 1111111111111111111111111111111111111111111111111111111111111110 1111111111111111111111111111111100000000000000000000000000000000 0000000000000000000000000000000011111111111111111111111111111111_{2}, that is, from the most significant bit: 255 '1's, 1 '0', 32 '1's, 64 '0's, 32 '1's.) The curve is given by the equation y^{2} = x^{3} − 3x + b, where b is given by a certain 384-bit number. The curve has order less than the field size. (Note: n = 394020061963944792122790401001436138 0507973927046544666794690527962765939911 3263569398956308152294913554433653942643) The bit-length of a key is considered to be that of the order of the curve, which is also 384 bits.
