= Centre for Applied Cryptographic Research =

The Centre for Applied Cryptographic Research (CACR) is a group of industrial representatives, professors, and students at the University of Waterloo in Waterloo, Ontario, Canada who work and do research in the field of cryptography.

The CACR aims to facilitate leading-edge cryptographic research, to educate students at postgraduate levels, to host conferences and research visits, and to partner with various industries. It was officially opened on June 19, 1998.

The CACR involves students and professors from four departments at the school: Combinatorics & Optimization, Computer Science, Electrical and Computer Engineering, and Pure Math. It does not have a physical location, but utilizes resources from all the aforementioned departments.

The CACR plays a part in many conferences and workshops, including the following:

- CACR Information Security Workshop
- Privacy and Security Workshop
- Workshop on Elliptic Curve Cryptography (ECC)
- Workshop on Selected Areas in Cryptography (SAC)

The CACR includes the following notable faculty:

- Scott Vanstone, professor, co-author of the Handbook of Applied Cryptography, founder of Certicom
- Alfred Menezes, professor, co-author of the Handbook of Applied Cryptography
- Neal Koblitz, adjunct professor, creator of elliptic curve cryptography and hyperelliptic curve cryptography
- Doug Stinson, professor, author of Cryptography: Theory and Practice
- Ian Goldberg, assistant professor, creator of Off-the-Record Messaging
