= OpenSSL =

Implementation of SSL and TLS protocols

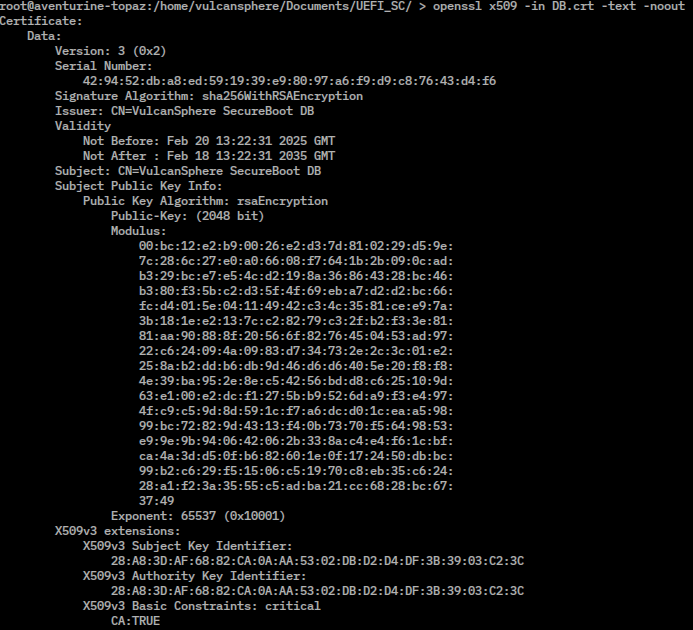
- openssl showing a X.509 certificate for UEFI Secure Boot
- Developer: The OpenSSL Project
- Release: 1998; 28 years ago
Stable release
- Stable: 4.1.0 / 23 October 2026; 28 days ago
- Written in: C, Assembly, Perl
- Type: Cryptography library
- License: 3.0 and later: Apache-2.0; 1.x and earlier: OpenSSL
- Website: www.openssl.org
- Repository: github.com/openssl

OpenSSL is a software library for applications that provide secure communications over computer networks against eavesdropping, and identify the party at the other end. It is widely used by Internet servers, including the majority of HTTPS websites.

OpenSSL contains an open-source implementation of the SSL and TLS protocols. The core library, written in the C programming language, implements basic cryptographic functions and provides various utility functions. Wrappers allowing the use of the OpenSSL library in a variety of computer languages are available.

The OpenSSL Software Foundation (OSF) represents the OpenSSL project in most legal capacities including contributor license agreements, managing donations, and so on. OpenSSL Software Services (OSS) also represents the OpenSSL project for support contracts.

OpenSSL is available for most Unix-like operating systems (including Linux, macOS, and BSD), Microsoft Windows and OpenVMS.

== Project history ==
The OpenSSL project was founded in 1998 to provide a free set of encryption tools for the code used on the Internet. It is based on a fork of SSLeay by Eric Andrew Young and Tim Hudson, which unofficially ended development on December 17, 1998, when Young and Hudson both went to work for RSA Security. The initial founding members were Mark Cox, Ralf Engelschall, Stephen Henson, Ben Laurie, and Paul Sutton.

In 2018 OpenSSL version numbering skipped from 1.1.1 to 3.0.0, omitting 2 as a major version number to avoid a conflict with one of OpenSSL's modules. Version 3.0.0 was the first to use the Apache License.

As of May 2019, the OpenSSL management committee consisted of seven people and there are seventeen developers with commit access (many of whom are also part of the OpenSSL management committee). There were only two full-time employees (fellows) and the remainder were volunteers.

By 2024, there were fourteen employees.

The project had a total income of US$5.5 million in 2024. Development of TLS 1.3 was sponsored by Akamai.

== Major version releases ==
OpenSSL release history
Version	Original release date	Support until	Comment	Last minor version
0.9.1	23 December 1998		Official start of the OpenSSL project	0.9.1c (23 December 1998)
0.9.2	22 March 1999		Successor of 0.9.1c	0.9.2b (6 April 1999)
0.9.3	25 May 1999		Successor of 0.9.2b	0.9.3a (27 May 1999)
0.9.4	9 August 1999		Successor of 0.9.3a	0.9.4 (9 August 1999)
0.9.5	28 February 2000		Successor of 0.9.4	0.9.5a (1 April 2000)
0.9.6	24 September 2000		Successor of 0.9.5a	0.9.6m (17 March 2004)
0.9.7	31 December 2002		Successor of 0.9.6m	0.9.7m (23 February 2007)
0.9.8	5 July 2005		Successor of 0.9.7m	0.9.8zh (3 December 2015)
1.0.0	29 March 2010		Successor of 0.9.8n	1.0.0t (3 December 2015)
1.0.1	14 March 2012	31 December 2016	Successor of 1.0.0h; Support for TLS/DTLS heartbeat; Support for SCTP; Support for TLS keying material exporter; Support for DTLS key establishment for SRTP; Next Protocol Negotiation; PSS signatures in certificates, requests and certificate revocation lists (CRL); Support for password based recipient info for CMS; Support for TLS 1.2 and TLS 1.1; Preliminary FIPS 140 capability for unvalidated 2.0 FIPS module; Secure Remote Password protocol (SRP) support	1.0.1u (22 September 2016)
1.0.2	22 January 2015	31 December 2019	Successor of 1.0.1l; Suite B support for TLS 1.2 and DTLS 1.2; Support for DTLS 1.2; TLS automatic elliptic curve (EC) selection; API to set TLS supported signature algorithms and curves; SSL_CONF configuration API; TLS Brainpool support; ALPN support; CMS support for RSA-PSS, RSA-OAEP, ECDH and ANSI X9.42; FIPS 140 support	1.0.2u (20 December 2019)
1.1.0	25 August 2016	11 September 2019	Successor of 1.0.2h; Support for BLAKE2; Support for ChaCha20-Poly1305; Support for X25519; Support for DANE and Certificate Transparency; Support for CCM Ciphersuites; Support for extended master secret; SSLv2 removed; Kerberos ciphersuite support removed; RC4 and 3DES removed from DEFAULT ciphersuites in libssl; Remove DSS, SEED, IDEA, CAMELLIA, and AES-CCM from the DEFAULT cipherlist; 40 and 56 bit cipher support removed from libssl; FIPS 140 support removed	1.1.0l (10 September 2019)
1.1.1 LTS	11 September 2018	11 September 2023 (LTS)	Successor of 1.1.0i; Support for TLS 1.3; Support for SHA-3; Support for X448 and Ed448; Support for SipHash; Support for ARIA; Support for multi-prime RSA; Support for SM2, SM3 and SM4; Heartbeat removed; QNX support removed	1.1.1w (11 September 2023)
3.0 LTS (Note: The major version 2.0.0 was skipped due to its previous use in the OpenSSL FIPS module.)	7 September 2021	7 September 2026 (LTS)	Relicensed to the Apache License 2.0; FIPS 140-2 support re-added.; Crypto Providers, as a replacement for Crypto Engines; Support for CMP (Certificate Management Protocol)	3.0.22 (25 August 2026)
3.1	14 March 2023	14 March 2025	FIPS 140-3 compliance; Performance enhancements	3.1.8 (11 February 2025)
3.2	23 November 2023	25 November 2025	Client-side QUIC support; TLS Certificate compression; Deterministic use of ECDSA; TLS raw public keys	3.2.6 (30 September 2025)
3.3	9 April 2024	9 April 2026		3.3.7 (7 April 2026)
3.4	22 October 2024	22 October 2026		3.4.8 (29 September 2026)
3.5 LTS	8 April 2025	8 April 2030 (LTS)	Support for PQC algorithms (ML-KEM, ML-DSA and SLH-DSA); Support for server side QUIC (RFC 9000); Support for 3rd party QUIC stacks including 0-RTT support; Support added for opaque symmetric key objects (EVP_SKEY); A new configuration option no-tls-deprecated-ec to disable support for TLS groups deprecated in RFC8422; A new configuration option enable-fips-jitter to make the FIPS provider to use the JITTER seed source; Support for central key generation in CMP; Support for multiple TLS keyshares and improved TLS key establishment group configurability; API support for pipelining in provided cipher algorithms	Ongoing development
3.6	1 October 2025	1 November 2026		3.6.5 (29 September 2026)
4.0	14 April 2026	14 May 2027		Ongoing development
Legend: Unsupported Supported Latest version

== Algorithms ==
OpenSSL supports a number of different cryptographic algorithms:

Ciphers
AES, Blowfish, Camellia, ChaCha20, Poly1305, SEED, CAST-128, DES, IDEA, RC2, RC4, RC5, Triple DES, GOST 28147-89, SM4
Cryptographic hash functions
MD5, MD4, MD2, SHA-1, SHA-2, SHA-3, RIPEMD-160, MDC-2, GOST R 34.11-94, BLAKE2, Whirlpool, SM3
Public-key cryptography
RSA, DSA, Diffie–Hellman key exchange, Elliptic curve, X25519, Ed25519, X448, Ed448, GOST R 34.10-2001, SM2

(Perfect forward secrecy is supported using elliptic-curve Diffie–Hellman since version 1.0.)

== FIPS 140 validation ==
FIPS 140 is a U.S. Federal program for the testing and certification of cryptographic modules. An early FIPS 140-1 certificate for OpenSSL's FOM 1.0 was revoked in July 2006 "when questions were raised about the validated module's interaction with outside software." The module was re-certified in February 2007 before giving way to FIPS 140-2. OpenSSL 1.0.2 supported the use of the OpenSSL FIPS Object Module (FOM), which was built to deliver FIPS approved algorithms in a FIPS 140-2 validated environment. OpenSSL controversially decided to categorize the 1.0.2 architecture as 'end of life' or 'EOL', effective December 31, 2019, despite objections that it was the only version of OpenSSL that was currently available with support for FIPS mode. As a result of the EOL, many users were unable to properly deploy the FOM 2.0 and fell out of compliance because they did not secure extended support for the 1.0.2 architecture, although the FOM itself remained validated for eight months further.

The FIPS Object Module 2.0 remained FIPS 140-2 validated in several formats until September 1, 2020, when NIST deprecated the usage of FIPS 186-2 for Digital Signature Standard and designated all non-compliant modules as 'Historical'. This designation includes a caution to federal agencies that they should not include the module in any new procurements. All three of the OpenSSL validations were included in the deprecation – the OpenSSL FIPS Object Module (certificate #1747), OpenSSL FIPS Object Module SE (certificate #2398), and OpenSSL FIPS Object Module RE (certificate #2473). Many 'private label' OpenSSL-based validations and clones created by consultants were also moved to the Historical List, although some FIPS validated modules with replacement compatibility avoided the deprecation, such as BoringCrypto from Google and CryptoComply from SafeLogic.

The OpenSSL Management Committee announced a change in the versioning scheme.

Due to this change, the major number of the next major version would have been doubled, since the OpenSSL FIPS module already occupied this number. Therefore, the decision was made to skip the OpenSSL 2.0 version number and continue with OpenSSL 3.0 .

OpenSSL 3.0 restored FIPS mode and underwent FIPS 140-2 testing, but with significant delays: The effort was first kicked off in 2016 with support from SafeLogic and further support from Oracle in 2017, but the process has been challenging.

On October 20, 2020, the OpenSSL FIPS Provider 3.0 was added to the CMVP Implementation Under Test List, which reflected an official engagement with a testing lab to proceed with a FIPS 140-2 validation. This resulted in a slew of certifications in the following months.

== Licensing ==
OpenSSL was dual-licensed under the OpenSSL License and the SSLeay License, which means that the terms of either licenses can be used. The OpenSSL License is Apache License 1.0 and SSLeay License bears some similarity to a 4-clause BSD License. As the OpenSSL License was Apache License 1.0, but not Apache License 2.0, it requires the phrase "this product includes software developed by the OpenSSL Project for use in the OpenSSL Toolkit" to appear in advertising material and any redistributions (Sections 3 and 6 of the OpenSSL License). Due to this restriction, the OpenSSL License and the Apache License 1.0 are incompatible with the GNU GPL. Some GPL developers have added an OpenSSL exception to their licenses that specifically permits using OpenSSL with their system. GNU Wget and climm both use such exceptions. Some packages (like Deluge) explicitly modify the GPL license by adding an extra section at the beginning of the license documenting the exception. Other packages use the LGPL-licensed GnuTLS, BSD-licensed Botan, or MPL-licensed NSS, which perform the same task.

OpenSSL announced in August 2015 that it would require most contributors to sign a Contributor License Agreement (CLA), and that OpenSSL would eventually be relicensed under the terms of Apache License 2.0. This process commenced in March 2017, and was complete in 2018.

On 7 September 2021, OpenSSL 3.0.0 was released under the Apache License 2.0.

== Notable vulnerabilities ==
=== Denial of service (DOS): ASN.1 parsing ===
OpenSSL 0.9.6k has a bug where certain ASN.1 sequences triggered a large number of recursions on Windows machines, discovered on November 4, 2003. Windows could not handle large recursions correctly, so OpenSSL would crash as a result. Being able to send arbitrary large numbers of ASN.1 sequences would cause OpenSSL to crash as a result.

=== OCSP stapling vulnerability ===
When creating a handshake, the client could send an incorrectly formatted ClientHello message, leading to OpenSSL parsing more than the end of the message. Assigned the identifier CVE-2011-0014 by the CVE project, this affected all OpenSSL versions 0.9.8h to 0.9.8q and OpenSSL 1.0.0 to 1.0.0c. Since the parsing could lead to a read on an incorrect memory address, it was possible for the attacker to cause a DoS. It was also possible that some applications expose the contents of parsed OCSP extensions, leading to an attacker being able to read the contents of memory that came after the ClientHello.

=== ASN.1 BIO vulnerability ===
When using Basic Input/Output (BIO) or FILE based functions to read untrusted DER format data, OpenSSL is vulnerable. This vulnerability was discovered on April 19, 2012, and was assigned the CVE identifier CVE-2012-2110. While not directly affecting the SSL/TLS code of OpenSSL, any application that was using ASN.1 functions (particularly d2i_X509 and d2i_PKCS12) were also not affected.

=== SSL, TLS and DTLS plaintext recovery attack ===
In handling CBC cipher-suites in SSL, TLS, and DTLS, OpenSSL was found vulnerable to a timing attack during the MAC processing. Nadhem Alfardan and Kenny Paterson discovered the problem, and published their findings on February 5, 2013. The vulnerability was assigned the CVE identifier CVE-2013-0169.

=== Predictable private keys (Debian-specific) ===
OpenSSL's pseudo-random number generator acquires entropy using complex programming methods. To keep the Valgrind analysis tool from issuing associated warnings, a maintainer of the Debian distribution applied a patch to Debian's variant of the OpenSSL suite, which inadvertently broke its random number generator by limiting the overall number of private keys it could generate to 32,768. The broken version was included in the Debian release of September 17, 2006 (version 0.9.8c-1), also compromising other Debian-based distributions, for example Ubuntu. Ready-to-use exploits are easily available.

The error was reported by Debian on May 13, 2008. On the Debian 4.0 distribution (etch), these problems were fixed in version 0.9.8c-4etch3, while fixes for the Debian 5.0 distribution (lenny) were provided in version 0.9.8g-9.

=== Heartbleed ===
A logo representing the Heartbleed bug

OpenSSL versions 1.0.1 through 1.0.1f have a severe memory handling bug in their implementation of the TLS Heartbeat Extension that could be used to reveal up to 64 KB of the application's memory with every heartbeat (CVE-2014-0160). By reading the memory of the web server, attackers could access sensitive data, including the server's private key. This could allow attackers to decode earlier eavesdropped communications if the encryption protocol used does not ensure perfect forward secrecy. Knowledge of the private key could also allow an attacker to mount a man-in-the-middle attack against any future communications. The vulnerability might also reveal unencrypted parts of other users' sensitive requests and responses, including session cookies and passwords, which might allow attackers to hijack the identity of another user of the service.

At its disclosure on April 7, 2014, around 17% or half a million of the Internet's secure web servers certified by trusted authorities were believed to have been vulnerable to the attack. However, Heartbleed can affect both the server and client.

=== CCS injection vulnerability ===
The CCS Injection Vulnerability (CVE-2014-0224) is a security bypass vulnerability that results from a weakness in OpenSSL methods used for keying material.

This vulnerability can be exploited through the use of a man-in-the-middle attack, where an attacker may be able to decrypt and modify traffic in transit. A remote unauthenticated attacker could exploit this vulnerability by using a specially crafted handshake to force the use of weak keying material. Successful exploitation could lead to a security bypass condition where an attacker could gain access to potentially sensitive information. The attack can only be performed between a vulnerable client and server.

OpenSSL clients are vulnerable in all versions of OpenSSL before the versions 0.9.8za, 1.0.0m and 1.0.1h. Servers are only known to be vulnerable in OpenSSL 1.0.1 and 1.0.2-beta1. Users of OpenSSL servers earlier than 1.0.1 are advised to upgrade as a precaution.

=== ClientHello sigalgs DoS ===
This vulnerability (CVE-2015-0291) allows anyone to take a certificate, read its contents and modify it accurately to abuse the vulnerability causing a certificate to crash a client or server. If a client connects to an OpenSSL 1.0.2 server and renegotiates with an invalid signature algorithms extension, a null-pointer dereference occurs. This can cause a DoS attack against the server.

A Stanford Security researcher, David Ramos, had a private exploit and presented it to the OpenSSL team, which then patched the issue.

OpenSSL classified the bug as a high-severity issue, noting version 1.0.2 was found vulnerable.

=== Key recovery attack on Diffie–Hellman small subgroups ===
This vulnerability (CVE-2016-0701) allows, when some particular circumstances are met, to recover the OpenSSL server's private Diffie–Hellman key. An Adobe System Security researcher, Antonio Sanso, privately reported the vulnerability.

OpenSSL classified the bug as a high-severity issue, noting only version 1.0.2 was found vulnerable.

== Forks ==
=== Agglomerated SSL ===
In 2009, after frustrations with the original OpenSSL API, Marco Peereboom, an OpenBSD developer at the time, forked the original API by creating Agglomerated SSL (assl), which reuses OpenSSL API under the hood, but provides a much simpler external interface. It has since been deprecated in light of the LibreSSL fork circa 2015.

=== LibreSSL ===
In April 2014 in the wake of Heartbleed, members of the OpenBSD project forked OpenSSL starting with the 1.0.1g branch, to create a project named LibreSSL. In the first week of pruning the OpenSSL's codebase, more than 90,000 lines of C code had been removed from the fork.

=== BoringSSL ===
In June 2014, Google announced its own fork of OpenSSL dubbed BoringSSL. Google plans to co-operate with OpenSSL and LibreSSL developers. Google has since developed a new library, Tink, based on BoringSSL. Chromium-based browsers, including Microsoft Edge, have adopted BoringSSL.

=== AWS-LC ===
In September 2020, it was released as a general-purpose cryptographic library maintained by the Amazon Web Services Cryptography team to be used in the AWS cloud computing platform. It іs based on code from the OpenSSL and BoringSSL projects.

=== QuicTLS ===
QuicTLS is a collaborative fork between Akamai and Microsoft, based on OpenSSL 3.3 release. Some features and fixes are cherry-picked from the current OpenSSL repo.

== Criticisms ==
=== Backwards compatibility ===
Among developers communities, OpenSSL is often cited for introducing API compatibility breakage with each new major version, which requires software adaptations that tend to delay new version adoptions. This, combined with the fact that previous releases are generally maintained for no more than two years after a new major one is released, tends to force some vendors to anticipate software migrations very early while still having little time left to update to a new release, sometimes at the risk of losing some compatibility with existing software or risking regressions.

=== Delay between releases ===
While long-term support (LTS) releases are maintained for 5 years, accumulated delays in release timeframes tend to force operating system vendors to stay on the last supported release longer, leaving less margin when the new version is available. For example, OpenSSL 3.0 was initially expected for Q4 2019 and was finally issued 21 months later without extending the expected end of support for previously supported version 1.1.1, and this despite the significant changes that required adaptations to existing software.

=== Significant performance regressions ===
The reduced support delay of version 1.1.1 mentioned above causes further concerns to users whose workloads are sensitive to performance. Some time after general availability of 3.0, some users started to report serious performance regressions affecting this version in multi-threaded environments, many citing the inefficient use of locks in frequent low-level operations, citing slowdowns from 80 to 400 times. The OpenSSL team has created a meta-issue to try to centralize reports of such massive performance regressions. About half of these reporters indicate the impossibility for them to upgrade to 3.0 from earlier versions, adding to the trouble caused by the limited support time left on previous version 1.1.1.

=== Consideration for users' requirements ===
While the QUIC transport layer was being worked on to support the third version of the HTTP protocol, it was proposed to use TLS to provide security, and identified that some adaptations to TLS libraries would be needed. Such modifications were brought to BoringSSL which was the library being primarily used by QUIC developers by then, and later ported to other libraries. A port of this work was quickly proposed to OpenSSL. While some discussion started the same day, it quickly stalled and was first blocked on license considerations, then kept on hold once these concerns were cleared. Finally 10 months later the OpenSSL Management Committee announced on a blog post that this patch set would not be adopted for 3.0 on the fear that the API would change over time. Finally more than one year after planned release of 3.0 which was still not coming, a team of volunteers from Akamai and Microsoft decided to fork the project as QuicTLS and support these patches on top of the OpenSSL code in order to unblock QUIC development. This action was generally welcomed by the community. Finally after OpenSSL 3.0 was finally released, the QUIC patch set was reconsidered and decided against, causing tens to hundreds of reactions of disappointment among the community. The pull request was closed, while users felt the need to publicly express their disappointment, or beg operating system vendors to support the alternative QuicTLS fork, or seek for alternative solutions. Finally Rich Salz, co-founder of the QuicTLS fork, announced his interest in seeing an Apache project forked from QuicTLS. As of 25 February 2023 there is still no QUIC-compatible long-term supported TLS library available by default in operating systems without requiring end-users to rebuild it themselves from sources.

== See also ==
- Comparison of TLS implementations
- Comparison of cryptography libraries
- List of free and open-source software packages
- POSSE project
- LibreSSL
- wolfSSL
