= Alfred Menezes =

Canadian cryptographer

- Born: Alfred J. Menezes; 1965 (age 60–61); Tanzania
- Occupations: Mathematician; Cryptographer
- Known for: MOV attack on ECC; MQV key agreement, co-founder of Centre for Applied Cryptographic Research

Academic background
- Education: University of Waterloo (B.Math, 1987; M.Math, 1989; Ph.D., 1992)
- Doctoral advisor: Scott Vanstone

Academic work
- Institutions: University of Waterloo

Alfred Menezes is co-author of several books on cryptography, including the Handbook of Applied Cryptography, and is a professor of mathematics at the University of Waterloo in Canada.

== Education ==
Alfred Menezes' family is from Goa, a state in western India, but he was born in Tanzania and grew up in Kuwait except for a few years at a boarding school in India. His undergraduate and post-graduate degrees are from the University of Waterloo.

== Academic career ==
After five years teaching at Auburn University, in 1997 he returned to the University of Waterloo, where he is now a professor of mathematics in the Department of Combinatorics and Optimization. He co-founded and is a member of the Centre for Applied Cryptographic Research, and has served as its Managing Director. Menezes' main areas of research are Elliptic Curve Cryptography (ECC), provable security, and related areas. He is a Canadian citizen.

Menezes' book Elliptic Curve Public Key Cryptosystems, published in 1993, was the first book devoted entirely to ECC. He co-authored the widely-used reference book Handbook of Applied Cryptography.

In 2001 Menezes won the Hall Medal of the Institute of Combinatorics and its Applications.

Menezes has been a conference organizer or program committee member for approximately fifty conferences on Cryptography. He was Program Chair for Crypto 2007, and in 2012 he was an invited speaker at Eurocrypt.

Menezes, in co-operation with Neal Koblitz, authored a series of Another Look papers that describe errors or weaknesses in existing security proofs, the first being Another look at HMAC (2013). The two now maintain a website dedicated to this type of papers.

== Books ==
- Alfred J. Menezes; Paul C. van Oorschot & Scott A. Vanstone (1996). Handbook of Applied Cryptography. CRC Press. ISBN 0-8493-8523-7.
- Hankerson, D.; Vanstone, S.; Menezes, A. (2004). Guide to Elliptic Curve Cryptography. Springer Professional Computing. New York: Springer. doi:10.1007/b97644. ISBN 0-387-95273-X. S2CID 720546.
- Alfred J. Menezes (1993). Elliptic Curve Public Key Cryptosystems. Kluwer Academic Publishers. ISBN 0-7923-9368-6.
- Alfred Menezes; Ian Blake; Shuhong Gao; Ron Mullin; Scott Vanstone & Tomik Yaghoobian (1993). Applications of Finite Fields. Kluwer Academic Publishers. ISBN 0-7923-9282-5.

== Selected publications ==
- "Computing discrete logarithms in cryptographically-interesting characteristic-three finite fields" (with G. Adj, I. Canales-Martinez, N. Cruz-Cortes, T. Oliveira, L. Rivera-Zamarripa and F. Rodriguez-Henriquez), Cryptology ePrint Archive: Report 2016/914. https://eprint.iacr.org/2016/914
- "Another look at tightness II: Practical issues in cryptography" (with S. Chatterjee, N. Koblitz and P. Sarkar), Mycrypt 2016, Lecture Notes in Computer Science, 10311 (2017), 21–55. doi:10.1007/978-3-319-61273-7_3
- "Another look at HMAC" (with N. Koblitz), Journal of Mathematical Cryptology, 7 (2013), 225–251. doi:10.1515/jmc-2013-5004
- "Elliptic curve cryptography: The serpentine course of a paradigm shift" (with A. H. Koblitz and N. Koblitz), Journal of Number Theory, 131 (2011), 781–814. doi:10.1016/j.jnt.2009.01.006
- "Another look at 'provable security'" (with N. Koblitz), Journal of Cryptology, 20 (2007), 3–37. doi:10.1007/s00145-005-0432-z
- "An efficient protocol for authenticated key agreement" (with L. Law, M. Qu, J. Solinas and S. Vanstone), Designs, Codes and Cryptography, 28 (2003), 119–134. doi:10.1023/A:1022595222606
- "Solving elliptic curve discrete logarithm problems using Weil descent" (with M. Jacobson and A. Stein), Journal of the Ramanujan Mathematical Society, 16 (2001), 231–260.
- "The elliptic curve digital signature algorithm (ECDSA)" (with D. Johnson and S. Vanstone), International Journal on Information Security, 1 (2001), 36–63. doi:10.1007/s102070100002
- "Analysis of the Weil descent attack of Gaudry, Hess and Smart" (with M. Qu), Topics in Cryptology – CT-RSA 2001, Lecture Notes in Computer Science, 2020 (2001), 308–318. doi:10.1007/3-540-45353-9_23
- "Unknown key-share attacks on the station-to-station (STS) protocol" (with S. Blake-Wilson), Proceedings of PKC '99, Lecture Notes in Computer Science, 1560 (1999), 154–170. doi:10.1007/3-540-49162-7_12
- "Reducing elliptic curve logarithms to logarithms in a finite field" (with T. Okamoto and S. Vanstone), IEEE Transactions on Information Theory, 39 (1993), 1639–1646. doi:10.1109/18.259647

== See also ==
- List of University of Waterloo people
