= Claw finding problem =

The claw finding problem is a classical problem in complexity theory, with several applications in cryptography. In short, given two functions f, g, viewed as oracles, the problem is to find x and y such as f(x) = g(y). The pair (x, y) is then called a claw. Some problems, especially in cryptography, are best solved when viewed as a claw finding problem, hence any algorithmic improvement to solving the claw finding problem provides a better attack on cryptographic primitives such as hash functions.

== Definition ==
Let $A, B, C$ be finite sets, and $f: A \to C$, $g: B \to C$ two functions. A pair $(x,y) \in A \times B$ is called a claw if $f(x) = g(y)$. The claw finding problem is defined as to find such a claw, given that one exists.

If we view $f, g$ as random functions, we expect a claw to exist iff $|A| \cdot |B| \geq |C|$. More accurately, there are exactly $|A| \cdot |B|$ pairs of the form $(x,y)$ with $x \in A, y \in B$; the probability that such a pair is a claw is $1/|C|$. So if $|A| \cdot |B| \geq |C|$, the expected number of claws is at least 1.

== Algorithms ==
If classical computers are used, the best algorithm is similar to a Meet-in-the-middle attack, first described by Diffie and Hellman. The algorithm works as follows: assume $|A| \leq |B|$. For every $x \in A$, save the pair $(f(x),x)$ in a hash table indexed by $f(x)$. Then, for every $y \in B$, look up the table at $g(y)$. If such an index exists, we found a claw. This approach takes time $O(|A| + |B|)$ and memory $O(|A|)$.

If quantum computers are used, Seiichiro Tani showed that a claw can be found in complexity

$\sqrt[3]{|A|\cdot|B|}$ if $|A|\le|B|<|A|^2$ and

$\sqrt{|B|}$ if $|B|\ge|A|^2$.

Shengyu Zhang showed that asymptotically these algorithms are the most efficient possible.

== Applications ==
As noted, most applications of the claw finding problem appear in cryptography. Examples include:

- Collision finding on cryptographic hash functions.
- Meet-in-the-middle attacks: using this technique, k bits of round keys can be found in time roughly 2^{k/2+1}. Here f is encrypting halfway through and g is decrypting halfway through. This is why Triple DES applies DES three times and not just two.
