= Scott Vanstone =

Canadian cryptographer (1947 -2014)

- Born: Scott Alexander Vanstone; September 14, 1947
- Died: March 2, 2014 (aged 66); Milton, Ontario, Canada
- Occupations: Mathematician, Cryptographer
- Known for: Elliptic Curve Cryptography founder of Certicom
- Awards: RSA Award for Excellence in Mathematics; Catalyst Award for Lifetime Achievement in Innovation

Academic background
- Education: University of Waterloo
- Doctoral advisor: Ron Mullin

Academic work
- Institutions: University of Waterloo; Certicom
- Doctoral students: Paul van Oorschot; Alfred Menezes

Scott A. Vanstone (September 14, 1947 – March 2, 2014) was a mathematician and cryptographer in the University of Waterloo Faculty of Mathematics. He was a member of the school's Centre for Applied Cryptographic Research, and was also a founder of the cybersecurity company Certicom. He received his PhD in 1974 at the University of Waterloo, and for about a decade worked principally in combinatorial design theory, finite geometry, and finite fields. In the 1980s he started working in cryptography. An early result of Vanstone (joint with Ian Blake, R. Fuji-Hara, and Ron Mullin) was an improved algorithm for computing discrete logarithms in binary fields, which inspired Don Coppersmith to develop his famous exp(n^{1/3+ε}) algorithm (where n is the degree of the field).

Vanstone was one of the first to see the commercial potential of Elliptic Curve Cryptography (ECC), and much of his subsequent work was devoted to developing ECC algorithms, protocols, and standards. In 1985 he co-founded Certicom, which later became the chief developer and promoter of ECC.

Vanstone authored or coauthored five widely used books and almost two hundred research articles, and he held several patents. He was a Fellow of the Royal Society of Canada and a Fellow of the International Association for Cryptologic Research. In 2001 he won the RSA Award for Excellence in Mathematics, and in 2009 he received the Ontario Premier's Catalyst Award for Lifetime Achievement in Innovation.

He died on March 2, 2014, shortly after a cancer diagnosis.

== Bibliography ==
- van Oorschot, Paul; Vanstone, Scott A. (1989). An Introduction to Error Correcting Codes with Applications. Kluwer Academic Publishers. ISBN 9780792390176.
- Blake, Ian; Gao, Shuhong; Menezes, Alfred J.; Mullin, Ron; Vanstone, Scott A.; Yaghoobian, Tomik (1993). Applications of Finite Fields. Kluwer Academic Publishers. ISBN 0-7923-9282-5.
- Menezes, Alfred J.; van Oorschot, Paul; Vanstone, Scott A. (1996). Handbook of Applied Cryptography. CRC Press. ISBN 0-8493-8523-7.
- Hankerson, D.; Vanstone, S.; Menezes, A. (2004). Guide to Elliptic Curve Cryptography. Springer Professional Computing. New York: Springer. doi:10.1007/b97644. ISBN 0-387-95273-X. S2CID 720546.
- Gilbert, William J.; Vanstone, Scott A. (2005). Introduction to Mathematical Thinking: Algebra and Number Systems. Pearson Prentice Hall. ISBN 9780131848689.

== See also ==
- List of University of Waterloo people
