= SECG =

Cryptography standards organization

In cryptography, the Standards for Efficient Cryptography Group (SECG) is an international consortium founded by Certicom in 1998. The group exists to develop commercial standards for efficient and interoperable cryptography based on elliptic curve cryptography (ECC).

== Links and documents ==
- SECG home page
- SEC 1: Elliptic Curve Cryptography (Version 1.0 - Superseded by Version 2.0)
- SEC 1: Elliptic Curve Cryptography (Version 2.0)
- SEC 2: Recommended Elliptic Curve Domain Parameters (Version 1.0 - Superseded by Version 2.0
- SEC 2: Recommended Elliptic Curve Domain Parameters (Version 2.0)
- Certicom Patent Letter

== See also ==
- Elliptic curve cryptography
