= Schaub =

Schaub is a German surname. Notable people with the surname include:

- Bernhard Schaub (born 1954), Swiss holocaust denier
- Brendan Schaub (born 1983), American professional mixed martial artist
- Buddy Schaub (21st century), American punk rock trombonist
- Christoph Schaub (born 1958), Swiss film director and screenwriter
- David Schaub, special effects artist
- Diana Schaub, American philosopher
- Emelia Christine Schaub (1891–1995), American lawyer, Michigan's first elected woman prosecutor
- Fred Schaub (1960–2003), German football (soccer) player
- Frédéric Schaub (born 1987), Swiss football defender
- Jeffrey Schaub, American TV news anchor and reporter
- Julius Schaub (1898–1967), the chief aide and adjutant of Adolf Hitler
- Konrad Schaub, Canadian ice dancer
- Louis Schaub (born 1994), Austrian footballer
- Sir Luke Schaub (1690–1758), British diplomat
- Marc Schaub (born 1992), German professional ice hockey player
- Matt Schaub (born 1981), American football quarterback
- Sarah Schaub (born 1983), American actress
- Stefan Schaub (born 1952), German music teacher and scholar
- William F. Schaub (c.1900–1999), United States Assistant Secretary of the Army

== See also ==
- Schoff
- Schoof
- Shoaf
