= Schoof =

Schoof (Dutch: [sxoːf], German: [ʃoːf]) is a Low Saxon surname. Its Standard German equivalent is Schoff. Schaub is a High German dialect variant. Related to the English verb to shove, it means a gathering of like things. For example, birds migrating together are said to fly in a Schoof. It is also related to the English noun sheaf, which is another specific meaning of the word Schoof.

Notable people with the surname include:

- Dick Schoof (born 1957), Dutch prime minister from 2024 to 2026
- Irene Schoof (born 1963), Dutch cricketer
- Lauritz Schoof (born 1990), German rower
- Manfred Schoof (born 1936), German jazz trumpet player
- René Schoof (born 1955), Dutch mathematician
- Sebastian Schoof (born 1980), German football player

== See also ==
- Schoof cabinet
- Schoofs
- 17958 Schoof, a main-belt asteroid
- Schoof–Elkies–Atkin algorithm, extension of Schoof's algorithm by Noam Elkies and A. O. L. Atkin to improve its efficiency
- Schoof's algorithm, efficient algorithm to count points on elliptic curves over finite fields
