= René Schoof =

Dutch mathematician

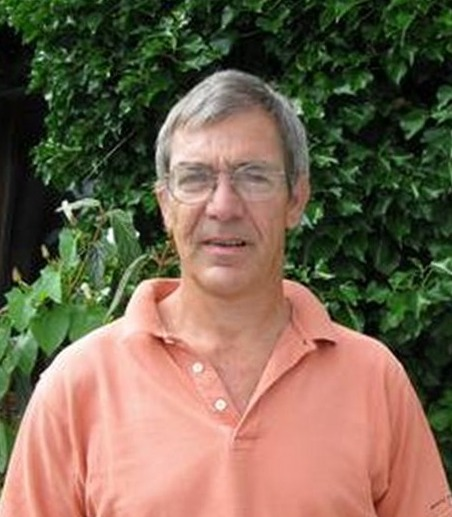
- Schoof at Oberwolfach, 2009
- Born: René J. Schoof; 8 May 1955 (age 71); Den Helder, Netherlands
- Education: University of Amsterdam
- Scientific career
- Fields: Mathematics
- Workplaces: University of Rome Tor Vergata
- Doctoral advisor: Hendrik W. Lenstra Jr.

René Schoof (born 8 May 1955 in Den Helder) is a mathematician from the Netherlands who works in number theory, arithmetic geometry, and coding theory.

He received his PhD in 1985 from the University of Amsterdam with Hendrik Lenstra (Elliptic Curves and Class Groups). He is now a professor at the University Tor Vergata in Rome.

In 1985, Schoof discovered an algorithm which enabled him to count points on elliptic curves over finite fields in polynomial time. This was important for the use of elliptic curves in cryptography, and represented a theoretical breakthrough, as it was the first deterministic polynomial time algorithm for counting points on elliptic curves. The algorithms known before (e.g. the baby-step giant-step algorithm) were of exponential running time. His algorithm was improved by A. O. L. Atkin (1992) and Noam Elkies (1990).

He obtained the best-known result extending Deligne's Theorem for finite flat group schemes to the non-commutative setting, over certain local Artinian rings. His interests range throughout Algebraic Number Theory, Arakelov theory, Iwasawa theory, problems related to the existence and classification of Abelian varieties over the rationals with bad reduction in one prime only, and algorithms.

In the past, René has also worked with Rubik's Cubes by creating a common strategy in speedsolving used to set many world records known as F2L Pairs, in which the solver creates four 2-piece "pairs" with one edge and corner piece which are each "inserted" into F2L slots in the CFOP method to finish the first two layers of a 3x3x3 Rubik's cube. This strategy is also used for all cubes of higher order (4x4x4 and up) in the Reduction, Yau, and Hoya methods if CFOP is used for their 3x3x3 stages.

He also wrote a book on Catalan's conjecture.

== See also ==
- Schoof's algorithm
- Schoof–Elkies–Atkin algorithm

== Some publications ==
- Counting points of elliptic curves over finite fields, Journal des Théories des Nombres de Bordeaux, No. 7, 1995, 219–254, pdf
- With Gerard van der Geer, Ben Moonen (editors): Number fields and function fields – two parallel worlds, Birkhäuser 2005
- Finite flat group schemes over Artin rings, Compositio Mathematica, v. 128 (2001), 1–15
- Catalan's Conjecture, Universitext, Springer, 2008
