= University of Rome Tor Vergata =

Public university in Rome, Italy

Coordinates: 41°51′13″N 12°36′12″E

Tor Vergata University of Rome
- Italian: Università degli Studi di Roma Tor Vergata
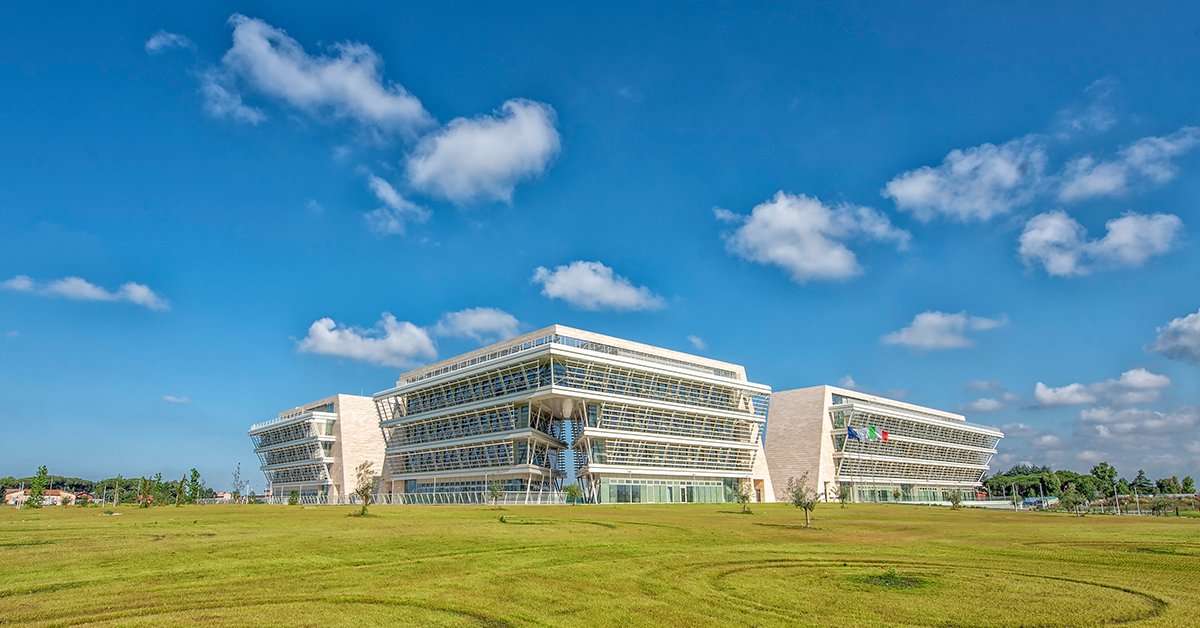
- Motto: Italian: Oggi, l'ateneo del domani
- Motto in English: Today, the University of tomorrow
- Type: Public
- Established: 1982; 44 years ago
- President: Prof. Nathan Levialdi Ghiron
- Faculty: 1,310
- Administrative staff: 985
- Students: 35,000
- Location: Rome, Italy
- Sports team: CUS Roma Tor Vergata
Colours
Green and White
- Website: web.uniroma2.it/en

Tor Vergata University of Rome, also known as the University of Tor Vergata (Italian: Università degli Studi di Roma Tor Vergata), is a public research university located in Rome, Italy. Located in the southeastern suburb of Rome, the university combines a liberal arts tradition with emphasis on career orientation in the fields of Economics, Engineering, Humanities, Mathematics, Physics and Natural Sciences, and Medicine and Surgery.

It was established in 1982 with the goal of providing high-quality education for students preparing to meet the changing needs and opportunities of the workforce. Furthermore, the university campus was designed to reflect the same atmosphere that students would feel on Anglophone campuses. Many professors of the university are important members of the Italian cultural and political environment. Its current rector is Nathan Levialdi Ghiron, a professor at the School of Engineering and former vice-Rector.

== Origin of the name ==
The university takes its name from the 14th-century farmhouse "Turris Virgata" that was owned by the Roman noble Annibaldi family, whose remains lie beneath Villa Gentile on campus.

== Campus ==
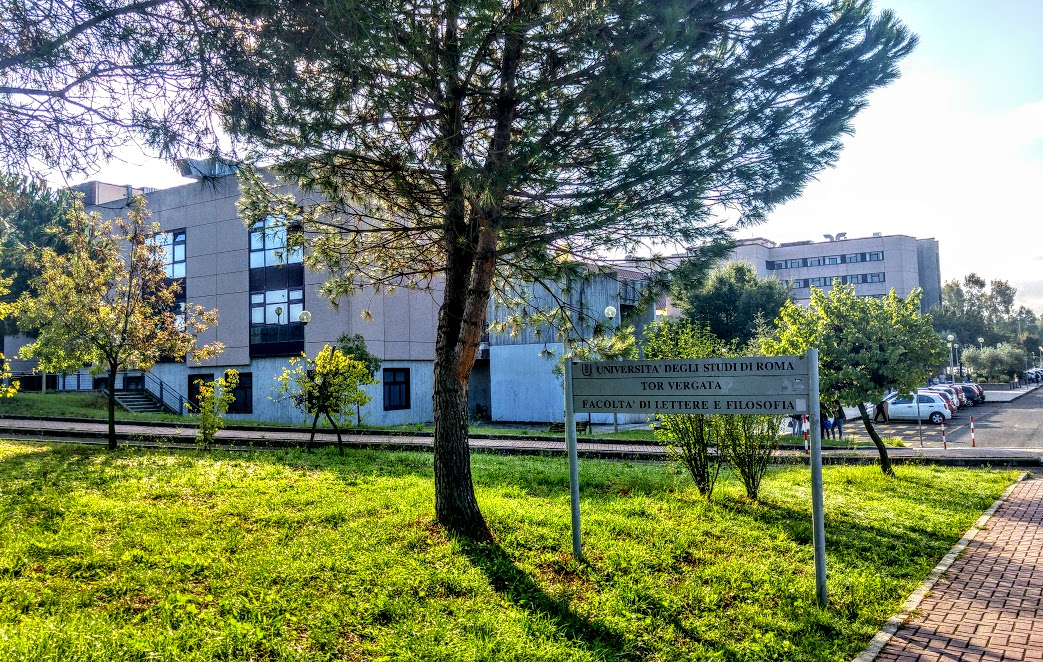
Faculty of Humanities at Tor Vergata University of Rome

The university occupies a 6-square-kilometre (1,483-acre) area outside the Grande Raccordo Anulare highway connection, in the eastern sector of the city. A university Hospital (Tor Vergata Polyclinic), with state-of-the-art medical equipment, is located on campus. Near the university, there are accommodation facilities owned by the regional organization Lazio DiSCo as well as Campus X, a private company. Campus X accommodations, rolled out in October 2010, now consist of over 1300 bed spaces for students and researchers, as well as study rooms, a market, a restaurant, a gym, a music recording studio and many other facilities. Campus X in Tor Vergata, designed and built on the basis of the campus in Berkeley, is at the present time the biggest accommodation facility for students in Italy, with its 15,000-square-metre (4-acre) area. In an effort to reduce environmental pollution as well as emission of greenhouse gases, Campus X facilities rely on both thermal and photovoltaic solar panels that provide up to 70% of hot water and street lighting needed on campus.

=== City of Sports ===
The innovative City of Sports project, designed by the internationally renowned Spanish architect Santiago Calatrava, was an integral part of the city of Rome's bid for the 2020 Summer Olympics and would have hosted the volleyball, gymnastics, trampoline, and basketball finals. On February 14, 2012, the Italian Prime Minister Mario Monti called an end to the bid, citing uncertain costs and unknown financial benefit. The announcement came a day before the deadline for applicant cities to submit the application files. The project would have transformed the area of south-east of Rome. The two main buildings of the project, the Sport Forum and Swimming Forum, are symmetrical, each of them being about 21,600-square-metre (5-acre) in area and around 75 m in height. The complex, whose construction had begun in April 2007, was to be completed in 2009 in time for the 2009 World Aquatics Championships but is still under construction. The new university tower, located on the opposite side of the road with respect to the City of Sports project, will rise to about 90 meters, whose penultimate floor would host the new administrative office of Tor Vergata, while the top floor would host a wide lobby that would offer panoramic views. The lower floors would welcome other offices. The layer below the tower would accommodate underground parking.

== Academics ==
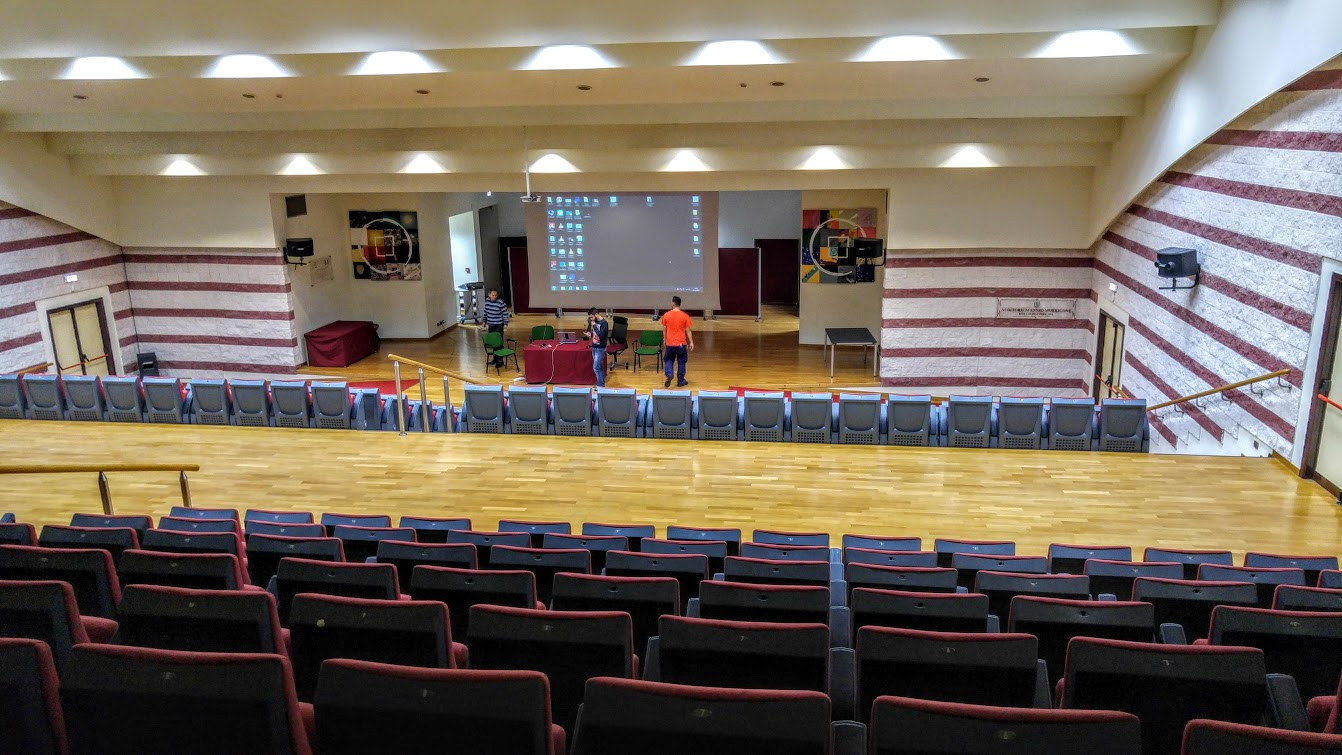
On-campus auditorium

The university is divided into six schools: Economics; Engineering; Humanities; Law; Mathematics, Physics and Natural Sciences; and Medicine and Surgery. There are 18 departments that, combined, offer 31 PhD programmes and 51 Master's degree programmes. The university also offers 55 undergraduate three-year Bachelor's degree programmes and 7 single-cycle degree programmes. Moreover, Tor Vergata University of Rome offers 20 international degree courses taught in English: 3 Bachelor's, 15 Master's and 2 Single-cycle degree courses. The university has taken significant steps in the past years to participate in international projects and to link industries to its research. It also participates in interdisciplinary dialogue with local businesses to provide support to entrepreneurial activities and small businesses.

Academic years (usually referred to as a.y. or a.a.) are typically divided into two semesters, the first starting in mid September and ending in mid January and the second starting in March and ending in mid June, with exam sessions being held between mid January and the end of February for first semester courses and between mid June and the end of July for second semester classes. Nonetheless, sometimes additional exam sessions may be held in September depending on the course and faculty. Students are asked to achieve a minimum of 60 ECTS credits each year to be considered on schedule with the course programme, which means and implies that a three-year Bachelor's degree course typically consists of 180 ECTS credits for the corresponding degree to be attained, while 120 ECTS credits are necessary for a Master's degree. Nevertheless, additional ECTS credits may be achieved as well in case students wished to attend additional classes or courses. A single course usually provides either 6, 9 or 12 ECTS, depending on its duration. More specifically, 6, 9 and 12 ECTS classes consist respectively of 60, 90 and 120 hours of lecture attendance.

Faculties and Departments of the University of Rome Tor Vergata
- School of Economics

- Department of Economics and Finance
- Department of Management and Law

- School of Engineering

- Department of Civil Engineering and Computer Science Engineering
- Department of Electronic Engineering
- Department of Enterprise Engineering "Mario Lucertini"
- Department of Industrial Engineering

- School of Humanities

- Department of History, Culture and Society
- Department of History, Philosophical and Art History Studies

- School of Law

- Department of Law

- School of Mathematics, Physics and Natural Sciences

- Department of Chemical Sciences and Technologies
- Department of Biology
- Department of Mathematics
- Department of Physics

- School of Medicine and Surgery

- Department of Systems Medicine
- Department of Biomedicine and Prevention
- Department of Clinical Science and Translational Medicine
- Department of Experimental Medicine and Surgery

=== Faculty of Economics ===
==== Centre of Economic and International Studies (CEIS) ====
Founded in 1987, The Centre of Economic and International Studies (CEIS) is an internationally recognized research centre within the Faculty of Economics at the University of Rome, Tor Vergata. CEIS is engaged in creating and supporting international research and higher-learning networking in the major fields of economics. CEIS hosts numerous seminars and conferences bringing together leading economists and experts in academia and government.

University rankings
- "Tor Vergata" University of Rome

Global – Overall
- ARWU World: 501–600 (2020)
- CWUR World: 311 (2021-22)
- CWTS World: 451 (2021)
- QS World: =355 (2026)
- QS Under 50: 71–80 (2021)
- THE World: 301–350 (2022)
- USNWR Global: 243 (2021)

=== Reputation ===
In the 2021 Best Global Universities Ranking by U.S. News & World Report L.P., the University of Rome Tor Vergata was ranked 243rd in the world, 106th in Europe and 12th in Italy. On the other hand, according to 2022 QS World University Rankings and Times Higher Education World University Rankings, the university was ranked respectively 494th and 301-350th. But due to the young age of the university, it is for sure important to look at international young university rankings: according to QS World University Rankings' Under 50 2021, the University of Rome Tor Vergata is ranked 71-80th in the world among universities which are under 50 years old. Further international rankings can be found in the table on the right side of the page.

Furthermore, the Faculty of Economics in Tor Vergata has been consistently ranked among the top 3 economics departments by La Repubblica newspaper's annual ranking of economic faculties in Italy and currently holds the top spot nationally and 96th worldwide. The school is particularly strong in the field of business, financial economics.

In addition, Tor Vergata University of Rome was ranked, in 2020, 101-150th for Automation and Control Engineering as well as for Energy Science and Engineering, and 201-300th for Telecommunication Engineering in the world by ARWU (Shanghai Ranking's Academic Ranking of World Universities). Moreover, it was ranked, by the same ranking organisation still in 2020, 76-100th for Mathematical Sciences and 51-75th for Physical Sciences in the world. The university was ranked 50th in the world in Physics also by Best Global Universities Ranking by U.S. News & World Report L.P. . Tor Vergata University of Rome was also ranked, by QS World University Rankings, 314th in the world for Engineering and Technology and, more specifically, 201-250th in the world for Electrical and Electronic Engineering and 251-300th for Chemical Engineering.

When it comes to its academic performance, Tor Vergata University of Rome was ranked 285th in the world and 9th in Italy for the a.y. 2020-21 by URAP (University Ranking by Academic Performance).

In 2020, the Performance Ranking of Scientific Papers for World Universities ranked the university 281st in the world. Moreover, the University of Rome Tor Vergata was ranked, in 2019, 59th among the best 175 young universities in the world which are under 50 years old, for its research outputs, according to 2019 Nature index ranking. In addition, according to the same index rankings, it was also ranked 43rd among the best 50 young universities in the world in physical sciences.

Apart from being ranked on the basis of its academic and research outcomes, Tor Vergata University of Rome has been also assessed for employability of students who graduated from the university, and for their average wage. In 2018, Tor Vergata University of Rome was ranked 8th in Italy for average wages of its graduates between 25 and 34 years of age, i.e. 5th in Italy if only public universities are taken into account. Furthermore, it was also determined to be, in 2017, the 2nd university in Central Italy for its graduate employability (i.e. 88.5%), making it comparable, when it comes to employability, to Northern Italy universities.

== Research ==
Research is carried out in 27 departmental and inter-departmental research centers. On campus there are also other major research institutions. The new main headquarters of the Italian Space Agency was inaugurated in Tor Vergata on July 25, 2012. Other important national centres include the Tor Vergata research establishment of National Research Council and the National Institute for Astrophysics. The close proximity and research ties with other distinguished research centers that are near campus, such as the Italian National Agency for New Technologies, Energy and Environment (ENEA), the European Space Agency Center for Earth Observation and the Italian National Institute of Nuclear Physics makes Tor Vergata a unique and dynamic research environment.

When it comes to its research outcomes, Tor Vergata University of Rome was ranked, in 2019, 18th in Italy and 200-300th in Europe (more specifically 300-400th for total project funding per partner and 100-200th for its total number of projects) among European academic and non-academic research institutions, according to the European Research Ranking. It was also ranked in 2014, by the same ranking institution, 31st in Europe with regard to its research diversity index.

== Affiliations ==
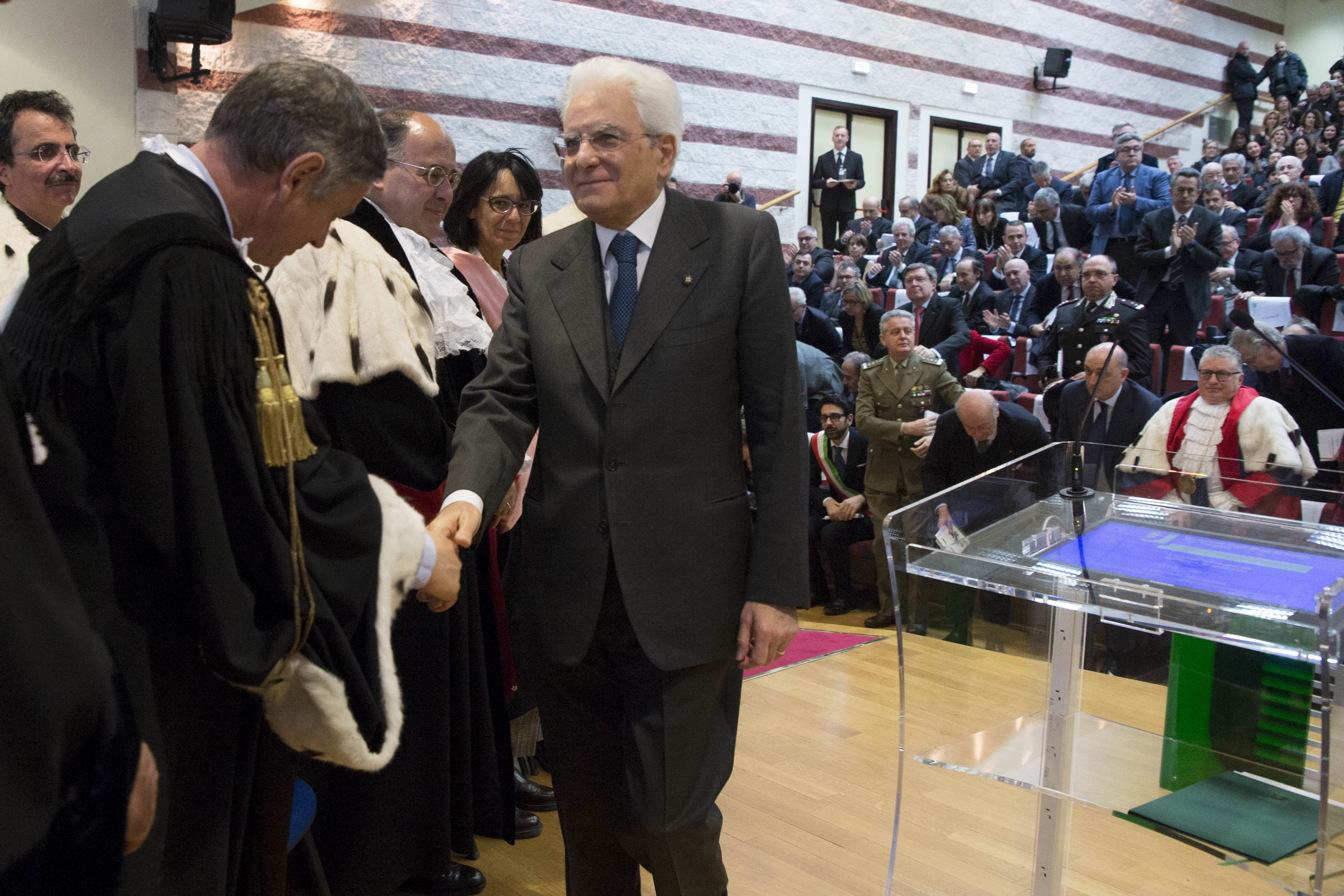
The President of the Republic of Italy Sergio Mattarella visiting the University of Rome Tor Vergata for 2016-17 academic year opening ceremony

In March 2019, the University of Rome Tor Vergata joined other seven European universities to form the Young Universities for the Future of Europe (YUFE) Alliance. In June 2019, the European Commission announced that YUFE was among the 17 projects that would receive funding for a three-year pilot under the European Universities Initiative, funded through the Erasmus+ programme. The main aim of this programme is to create 'European Universities' based on cross-border alliances of higher education institutions in order to share a long-term strategy and promote European values and identity, by creating a European university campus for the purpose of promoting students' physical and virtual mobility. Hand in hand with this aim goes the YUFE Diploma Supplement Track, rolled out in November 2020, a diploma supplement that acknowledges all the activities, projects and accomplishments, such as academic courses, professional training, etc, that students are given the chance to take part in across the various YUFE universities. Tor Vergata University of Rome is, at the moment, the only university in Italy that is part of the alliance.

Tor Vergata University of Rome is also part of the Young European Research Universities Network (Yerun), that aims to create and strengthen collaboration between high-ranked young universities in Europe, as well as of the Network of Universities from the Capitals of Europe (UNICA).

== English-taught programmes ==
The University of Rome Tor Vergata currently offers 22 courses taught in English.

=== Bachelor's degree programmes ===
- Business Administration and Economics (B.Sc., School of Economics)
- Global Governance (B.A., School of Economics)
- Engineering Sciences (B.Sc., School of Engineering)

=== Master's degree programmes ===
- Art History in Rome, from Late Antique to the Present (M.A., School of Humanities and Philosophy)
- Astrophysics (M.Sc., School of Mathematics, Physics and Natural Sciences)
- Biotechnology for Industry and Health (M.Sc., School of Mathematical, Physical and Natural Sciences)
- Business Administration (M.Sc., School of Economics)
- Chemistry for Nano-Engineering (M.Sc., Department of Industrial Engineering)
- Clinical Psychosexology (M.Sc., School of Medicine and Surgery)
- Economics (M.Sc., School of Economics)
- European Economy and Business Law (M.Sc., School of Economics)
- European History (M.A., School of Humanities and Philosophy)
- Finance and Banking (M.Sc., School of Economics)
- Management Engineering (M.Sc., School of Engineering)
- Mechatronics Engineering (M.Sc., School of Engineering)
- ICT and Internet Engineering (M.Sc., School of Engineering)
- Chemical Nano-Engineering (M.Sc., School of Engineering)
- Physical Activity and Health Promotion (M.Sc., School of Medicine and Surgery)
- Physics - Curriculum in Physics of Fundamental Interactions and Experimental Techniques (M.Sc., School of Mathematical, Physical and Natural Sciences)
- Physics - Curriculum in Physics of Complex Systems and Big Data (M.Sc., School of Mathematical, Physical and Natural Sciences)
- Tourism Strategy, Cultural Heritage and Made in Italy (M.A., School of Humanities and Philosophy)

=== Single-cycle degree programmes ===
- Medicine and Surgery (School of Medicine and Surgery)
- Pharmacy (School of Mathematical, Physical and Natural Sciences)

== Notable faculty members and alumni ==
- Orazio Schillaci, the current Italian Minister of Health, was the Rector of the University of Rome Tor Vergata, full professor of nuclear medicine and head of the Faculty of Medicine and Surgery of the same university
- Giovanni Tria, former Minister of Economy and Finance at the Italian Minister of Economy and Finances, professor of Political Economy, Dean of the School of Economics
- Renato Brunetta, Italian Minister of Public Administration, Member of the European Parliament, professor of Economics
- Antonio Dal Monte, physician and medical researcher, former Scientific Director and Head of the Department of Physiology and Biomechanics Institute of Sports Science of the Italian National Olympic Committee (C.O.N.I.)
- Cesare G. De Michelis, professor of Russian Literature
- Alessandro Ferrara, professor of Political Philosophy
- Enrico Giovannini, former OECD Director of Statistics, Professor of Economics and Italian Minister of Infrastructure and Transport
- Sabatino Moscati, archaeologist and linguist, professor of Semitic Philology
- Piero Niro, composer, classical pianist, laurea in Philosophy
- Mario Perniola, philosopher, professor of Aesthetics
- Simonetta Prosperi Valenti Rodinò, Art historian, professor of Modern Art History
- Alessandro Piperno, writer, professor of French literature
- Lucio Russo, physicist, mathematician and historian of Science, professor of Probability Calculus
- René Schoof, mathematician who published the homonymous algorithm (Schoof's Algorithm), professor of Mathematics
- Pietro Trifone, linguist, professor of history of the Italian language
- Gustavo Piga, professor of Economics
- Alfonso Pecoraro Scanio, former Italian Minister for the Environment, Land and Sea and former Member of the Italian Parliament
- Domenicangela Lina Unali, professor of English and American literature, novelist, poet, literary critic
- Stefano Semplici, philosopher, professor of Moral Philosophy and Social Ethics, former president of the UNESCO Bioethics Committee
