= Shoaff =

Shoaff is a surname. Notable people with the surname include:

- Benny Shoaff (1897–1960), American racing driver
- Carrie M. Shoaff (1849–1939), American artist, author, potter, playwright, correspondent
- John Earl Shoaff (1916–1965), American entrepreneur and philosopher

== See also ==
- Shoaf
