= Widener =

Widener can refer to:

== Places ==
- Widener Library, of Harvard University
- Widener University, a private university in Chester, Pennsylvania
  - Widener University School of Law, the law school of Widener University
- Widener, Arkansas, a town in St. Francis County, Arkansas, United States

== People ==
- Widener (surname), list of people with the surname

== See also ==
- Rhône (The) v. Peter A.B. Widener (The)
