= Jim Rohn =

American motivational speaker (1930–2009)

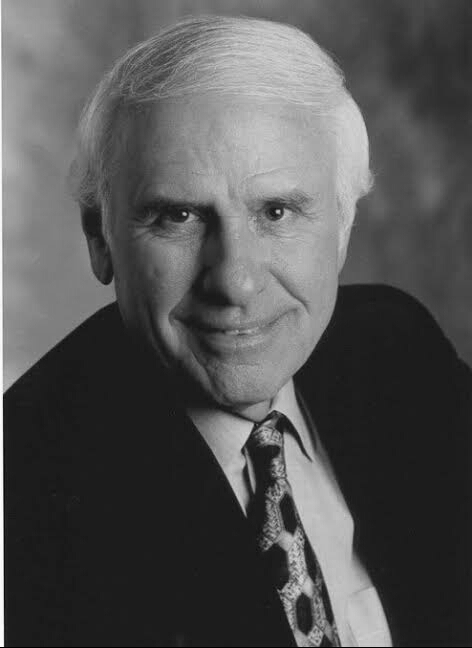
- Undated photograph of Rohn
- Born: Emanuel James Rohn; September 17, 1930; Yakima, Washington, U.S.
- Died: December 5, 2009 (aged 79); West Hills, Los Angeles, California, U.S.
- Occupations: Entrepreneur; author; motivational speaker

Emanuel James Rohn (September 17, 1930 – December 5, 2009) was an American entrepreneur, author, and motivational speaker. He wrote numerous books including How to Obtain Wealth and Happiness.

== Early life ==
Emanuel James Rohn was born at Yakima, Washington, to Emmanuel and Clara Rohn. His parents owned and worked a farm in Caldwell, Idaho, where Rohn grew up as an only child. He was born to a poor family, became a millionaire at age 31, and went broke when he was 33. He later became a millionaire again. Rohn left college after one year.

== Career ==
He started his professional life as a human resource manager for Sears. Around this time, a friend invited him to a lecture given by entrepreneur John Earl Shoaff. In 1955, Rohn joined Shoaff's direct selling business, AbundaVita, as a distributor.

In 1957, Rohn resigned his distributorship with AbundaVita and joined Nutri-Bio, another direct selling company. The company's founders, including Shoaff, started to mentor him. After this mentorship, Rohn built one of the largest organizations in the company. In 1960, when Nutri-Bio expanded into Canada, Shoaff and the other founders put Rohn in charge of the organization.

After Nutri-Bio went out of business in the early 1960s, Rohn was invited to speak at his Rotary Club. He accepted, and soon, others began asking him to speak at various luncheons and other events. In 1963, at the Beverly Hills Hotel, he gave his first public seminar. He then began presenting seminars across the country, telling his story and teaching his personal development philosophy.

Throughout the 1970s, Rohn conducted seminars for Standard Oil. At the same time, he participated in a personal development business called Adventures in Achievement, which featured live seminars and personal development workshops.

Rohn mentored Mark R. Hughes (the founder of Herbalife International) and life strategist Tony Robbins in the late 1970s. Others who credit Rohn for influencing their careers include authors/lecturers Mark Victor Hansen and Jack Canfield (Chicken Soup book series), Everton Edwards (Hallmark Innovators Conglomerate), Brian Tracy, Darren Hardy, and T. Harv Eker. Rohn coauthored the novel Twelve Pillars with Chris Widener.

Rohn was the recipient of the 1985 National Speakers Association CPAE Award for excellence in speaking. He was the author of 17 written, audio, and video media, including The Power of Ambition, Take Charge of Your Life, and The Day That Turns Your Life Around. Many of his speeches are available for free on social media platforms like YouTube, Spotify, and Instagram.

== Death ==
Rohn died of pulmonary fibrosis on December 5, 2009. He is buried at Forest Lawn Memorial Park in Glendale, California.

== Works ==
- 7 Strategies for Wealth & Happiness: Power Ideas from America's Foremost Business Philosopher ISBN 0761506160, 9780761506164
- My Philosophy For Successful Livings
- The Five Major Pieces to the Life Puzzle.
- The Power of Ambition
- The Seasons of Life
- 12 Pillars of Success
- How to Obtain Wealth and Happiness
