= Divisibility sequence =

Type of integer sequence

In mathematics, a divisibility sequence is an integer sequence $(a_n)$ indexed by positive integers n such that

$$\text{if }m\mid n\text{ then }a_m\mid a_n$$

for all m and n. That is, whenever one index is a multiple of another one, then the corresponding term also is a multiple of the other term. The concept can be generalized to sequences with values in any ring where the concept of divisibility is defined.

A strong divisibility sequence is an integer sequence $(a_n)$ such that for all positive integers m and n,

$$\gcd(a_m,a_n) = a_{\gcd(m,n)},$$

where gcd is the greatest common divisor function.

Every strong divisibility sequence is a divisibility sequence: $\gcd(m,n) = m$ if and only if $m\mid n$. Therefore, by the strong divisibility property, $\gcd(a_m,a_n) = a_m$ and therefore $a_m\mid a_n$.

== Examples ==
Any Lucas sequence of the first kind U_{n}(P, Q) is a divisibility sequence. Moreover, it is a strong divisibility sequence when gcd(P, Q) = 1. Specific examples include:

- Any constant sequence $a_n = k$ is a strong divisibility sequence, which is kU_{n}(1, 0) for n ≥ 1.
- Every sequence of the form $a_n = kn$, for some nonzero integer k, is a divisibility sequence. It is equal to kU_{n}(2, 1).
- The Fibonacci numbers F_{n} form a strong divisibility sequence, which is U_{n}(1, −1).
- The Mersenne numbers $a_n = 2^n-1$ form a strong divisibility sequence, which is U_{n}(3, 2).
- The repunit numbers R^{(b)}_{n} for n = 1, 2, ... in any base b form a strong divisibility sequence, which is U_{n}(b + 1, b).
- Any sequence of the form $a_n = A^n - B^n$ for integers $A>B>0$ is a divisibility sequence, which is (A − B)U_{n}(A + B, AB). If $A$ and $B$ are coprime then this is a strong divisibility sequence.

Elliptic divisibility sequences are another class of divisibility sequences.
