= Schoff =

Schoff is a Standard German surname, derived from the Low German Schoof. The word Schof is a specifically northern German word for a sheaf. The equivalent in southern, High German dialects is Schaub.

Notable people with the surname include:

- Rick Schoff, Australian rules footballer
- Stephen Alonzo Schoff, 19th-century American engraver
- Victor E. Schoff (born 1955), American conspiracy theorist
- Wilfred Harvey Schoff (1874–1932), American antiquarian and classical scholar
