= Widener (surname) =

Widener is a surname of German origin. Notable people with the surname are as follows:

- Chris Widener (born 1963), American politician
- Chris Widener (author) (born 1966), American author and motivational speaker
- Christine Ourmières-Widener (born 1964), French businesswoman
- Eleanor Elkins Widener (c. 1862–1937), American heiress
- George Widener (born 1962), autistic savant
- George Dunton Widener (1861–1912), American businessman who died in the sinking of the Titanic
- H. Emory Widener, Jr. (1923–2007), American judge
- Harry Elkins Widener (1885–1912), American book collector who died in the sinking of the Titanic
- Jeff Widener (born 1956), American photographer
- Joseph E. Widener (1871–1943), American art collector and founding benefactor of the National Gallery of Art in Washington, D.C.
- Peter Arrell Browne Widener (1834–1915), Philadelphia transit magnate
- Peter Arrell Browne Widener II (1895–1948), American race horse breeder and owner
- Taylor Widener (born 1994), American baseball player
- Warren Widener (1938–2013), American politician
