= Joseph Lehner =

American mathematician

Joseph Lehner (October 29, 1912, New York City – August 5, 2013, Haverford, PA) was a mathematician at Michigan State University (1957–1963), the University of Maryland (1963–1972), and the University of Pittsburgh (1972–1980). He worked on automorphic functions and introduced Atkin–Lehner theory.

== Publications ==
- Lehner, Joseph (1964), Discontinuous groups and automorphic functions, Mathematical Surveys, vol. VIII, Providence, R.I.: American Mathematical Society, MR 0164033
- Lehner, Joseph (1966), A short course in automorphic functions, New York-Toronto, Ont.-London: Holt, Rinehart and Winston, MR 0201637
- Lehner, Joseph (1969), Lectures on modular forms, Applied Mathematics Series, vol. 61, National Bureau of Standards, MR 0264070
- Atkin, A. O. L.; Lehner, J. (1970), "Hecke operators on Γ_{0} (m)", Mathematische Annalen, 185 (2): 134–160, doi:10.1007/BF01359701, ISSN 0025-5831, MR 0268123, S2CID 120159177
