= Schoofs =

Schoofs is a surname. Notable people with the surname include:

- Bibiane Schoofs (born 1988), Dutch tennis player
- Henri Schoofs (born 1950), Belgian long-distance runner
- Lucas Schoofs (born 1997), Belgian footballer
- Mark Schoofs, American journalist
- Rob Schoofs (born 1994), Belgian footballer

== See also ==
- Schoofs Nunatak, a nunatak of Palmer Land, Antarctica
- Schoof
