= Chris Widener (author) =

American author and motivational speaker (born 1966)

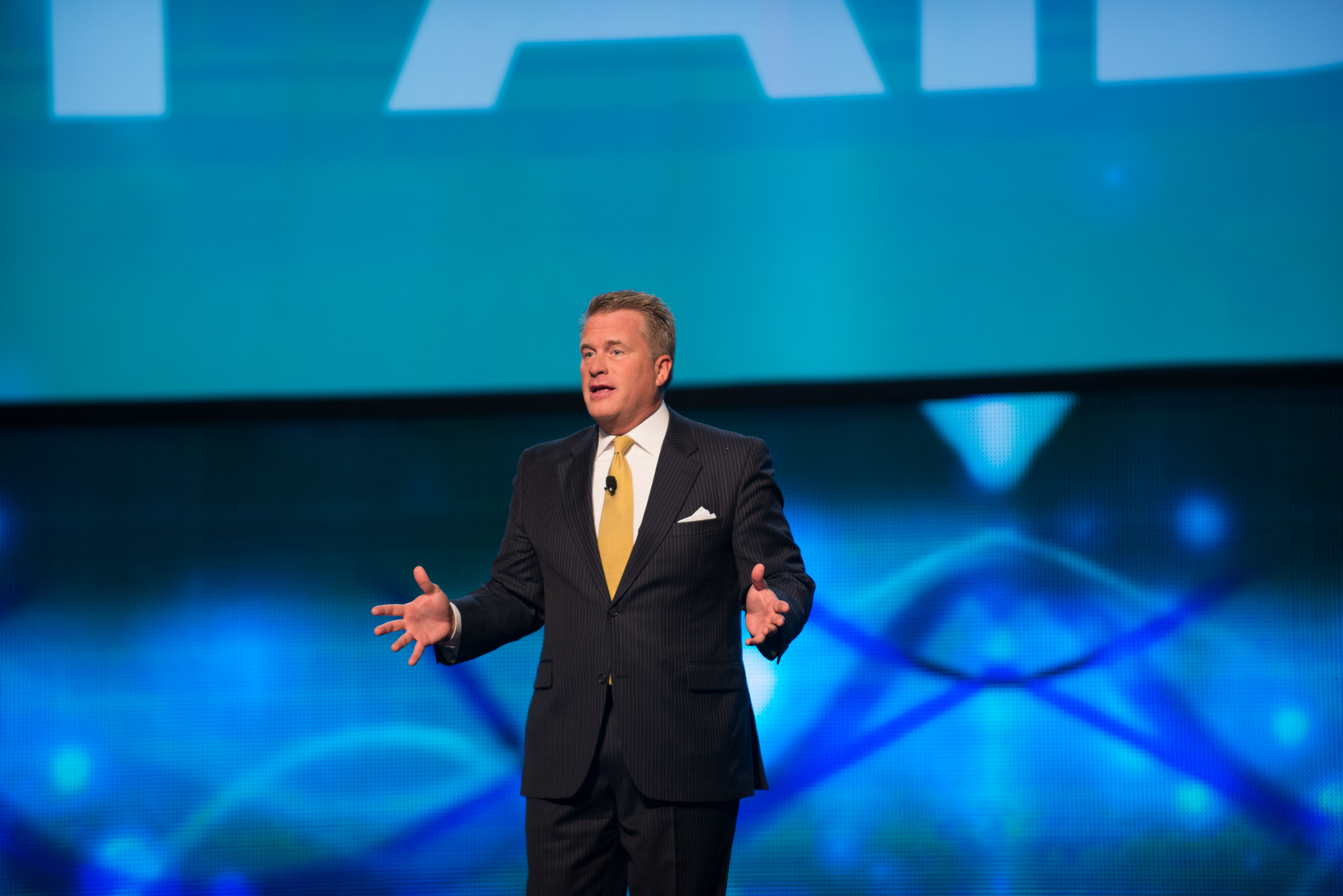
- Chris Widener
- Born: April 18, 1966 (age 58); Seattle, US
- Occupation(s): Author, motivational speaker
- Website: www.chriswidener.com

Chris Widener (born 18 April 1966) is an American author and motivational speaker. Widener has written several books on motivation and business and is a member of the Motivational Speakers Hall of Fame.

Widener first entered the public speaking industry in 1988. Widener started American Community Business Network, a publishing company later known as Made for Success, in the early 1990s.

He co-authored the 2005 book Twelve Pillars with motivational speaker Jim Rohn. In 2009, Widener sold Made for Success to his business partner. Widener hosted several programs for The Success Training Network, which was a web television site for marketing and motivational content.

Widener ran a campaign as a Republican for Senate in 2010 in Washington State, which was halted before the primaries.

== Bibliography ==
- Twelve Pillars (Jim Rohn International, 2005; ISBN 978-0972626637) with Jim Rohn
- The Image (Chris Widener International, 2006; ISBN 978-0972626699)
- Live the Life You Have Always Dreamed Of (Chris Widener International, 2006; ISBN 978-0972626606)
- The Angel Inside (Crown Business, 2007; ISBN 978-0307719539)
- The Art of Influence (Crown Business, 2008; ISBN 978-0385521031)
- Above All Else (Success Books, 2009; ISBN 978-0981951232)
- The Leadership Rules (Jossey-Bass, 2010; ISBN 978-0470914724)
