= Jeffrey Schaub =

American broadcast journalist

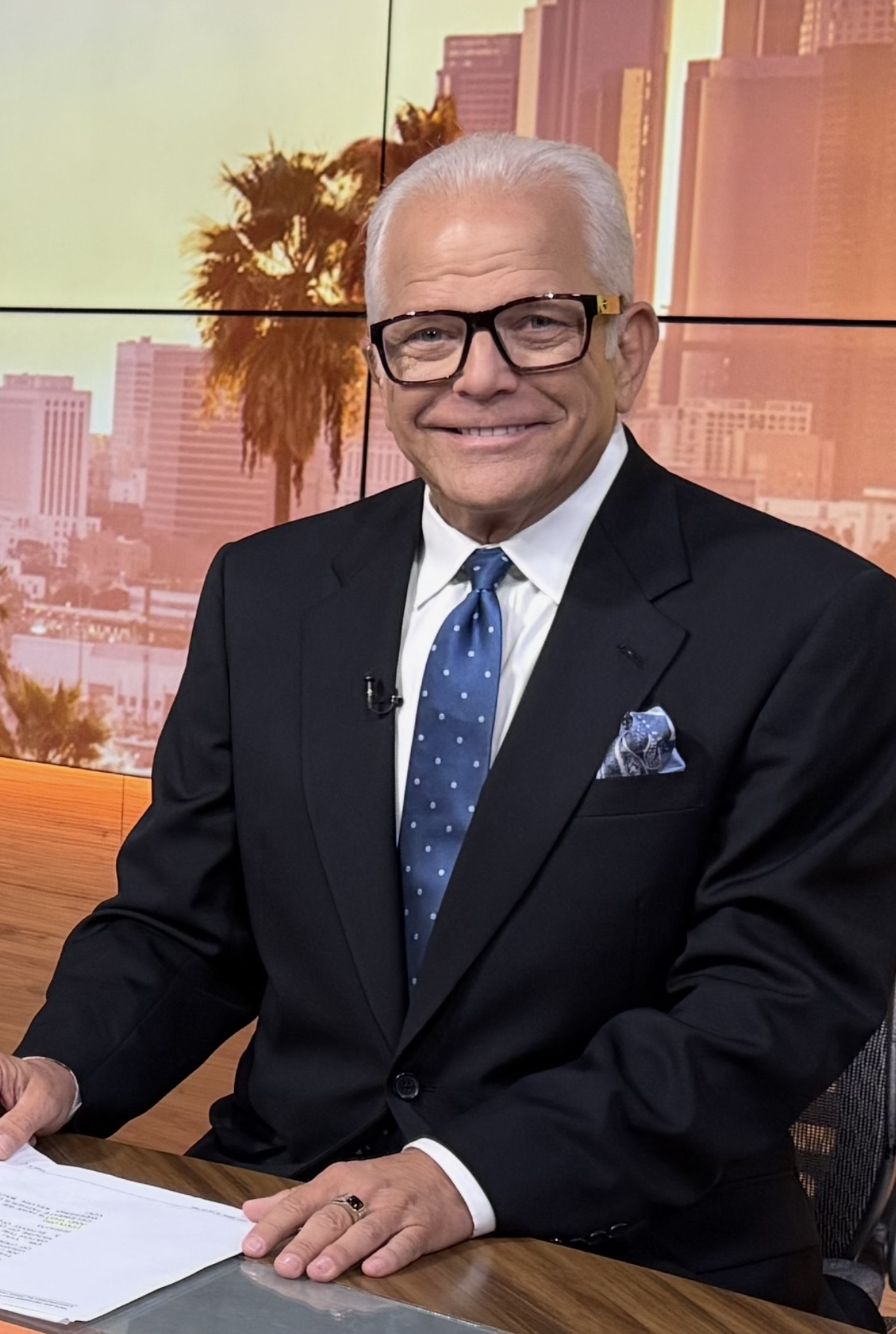
- Schaub anchoring with his son Taylor on Spectrum News 1 in Los Angeles.
- Education: Emerson College (BA)
- Occupation: Broadcast journalist
- Years active: 1981–present
- Known for: Bay Area television and radio journalism
- Television: KPIX-TV
- Children: 2, including Taylor Schaub
- Awards: Three regional Emmy Awards; shared Peabody Award

Jeffrey Schaub is an American broadcast journalist who has worked in Northern California television and radio for more than four decades. He was a reporter and anchor for KCBS Radio in San Francisco, where his reporting focused particularly on the North Bay, wildfires, public safety, transportation, environmental policy and community recovery.

Schaub previously spent approximately 20 years at KPIX-TV, the CBS-owned television station in San Francisco. During his tenure, he served as a reporter, news anchor and North Bay bureau chief and became the station's principal environmental correspondent. His career has included coverage of the 1989 Loma Prieta earthquake, the Oakland firestorm of 1991, the 2000 presidential election recount, the inauguration of President George W. Bush, the state funeral of Ronald Reagan, the crash of Asiana Airlines Flight 214 and several of California's most destructive wildfires.

== Early life and education ==
Schaub attended the Morristown-Beard School in Morristown, New Jersey, graduating in 1977. He subsequently studied broadcast communications at Emerson College in Boston, earning his bachelor's degree in 1981.

While attending Emerson, Schaub worked at the college radio station WERS and helped establish The Independent, a student newspaper. His experience in college radio helped lead to his early work in commercial broadcasting.

== Career ==
=== Early career ===
Schaub began his broadcasting career in radio and television in Aspen, Colorado. He later returned to Northern California and worked at KTIM radio in San Rafael, California.

Before joining KPIX-TV, Schaub worked in broadcast traffic reporting and eventually served as vice president of operations for Traffic Central, a service that produced traffic reports for radio and television stations in several western United States markets.

=== KPIX-TV ===
Schaub joined KPIX-TV in 1990 and remained with the station for approximately 20 years. He worked as a general-assignment reporter and anchor and later served as the station's North Bay bureau chief.

His reporting beats included education, transportation, energy, business, urban planning and environmental policy. From 2007 until 2010, he served as the correspondent for KPIX's environmental reporting unit, known as the Greenbeat. The beat examined environmental sustainability, renewable energy, climate policy, conservation and the emerging clean-technology industry.

Among Schaub's most prominent early assignments was the 1989 Loma Prieta earthquake, which struck shortly before Game 3 of the 1989 World Series. KPIX's earthquake coverage was subsequently recognized with a shared Peabody Award. He also reported on the Oakland firestorm of 1991, which killed 25 people and destroyed thousands of homes in the Oakland and Berkeley hills.

Schaub covered national politics for the station, reporting from six national political conventions. His other national assignments included the disputed 2000 United States presidential election, the first presidential inauguration of George W. Bush in 2001 and the state funeral of former President Ronald Reagan in 2004.

He also produced reporting about the British royal family and traveled to the United Kingdom for two series of reports.

Schaub left KPIX in 2010.

=== KGO Radio ===
Following his departure from television, Schaub joined KGO 810 as a reporter and anchor. He worked at the San Francisco radio station for approximately two years, continuing to cover breaking news and regional issues including transportation, the environment, police and fire agencies and local government.

=== KCBS Radio ===
In May 2012, Schaub returned to CBS-owned broadcasting when he joined KCBS All News, which airs on 740 AM and 106.9 FM in the San Francisco Bay Area. His hiring returned him to the same broadcast organization with which he had spent most of his television career.

At KCBS, Schaub has worked as a reporter and anchor with an emphasis on Marin, Sonoma and Napa counties. His assignments have included the July 2013 crash of Asiana Airlines Flight 214 at San Francisco International Airport and the October 2017 Tubbs Fire and other fires that devastated parts of Sonoma and Napa counties.

Schaub continued covering the aftermath of the 2017 North Bay fires in the years following the disaster, including the rebuilding of homes and communities in and around Santa Rosa. In 2022, he produced a series examining the region's recovery five years after the Tubbs Fire.

As part of that reporting, Schaub flew aboard Sonoma 1, Sonoma County's first dedicated firefighting and rescue helicopter. His report examined how regional fire agencies had changed their emergency response procedures following the Tubbs, Nuns and Kincade fires.

His KCBS reporting has also examined emergency-service funding, homelessness and the work of community organizations. A 2022 report about a Marin County nonprofit serving unhoused residents prompted KCBS listeners to make donations to the organization during the Thanksgiving holiday.

== Awards and recognition ==
Schaub has received three regional Emmy Awards for his work in broadcast journalism. He was also a contributor to KPIX's Peabody Award-winning coverage of the 1989 Loma Prieta earthquake.

His work has additionally received multiple honors from the Radio Television Digital News Association, formerly known as the Radio-Television News Directors Association.

== Public appearances ==
In 2009, Schaub served as master of ceremonies for the Cleantech Open gala and awards ceremony, an event honoring entrepreneurs and companies working in clean technology.

He was also a speaker at Sonoma State University's 2001 Lincoln Steffens Awards dinner, which recognized journalism concerning public records, government accountability and institutional abuse.

== Personal life ==
Schaub has lived in Marin County, California. His son, Chris is a real estate agent and his other son Taylor Schaub, is a television sports anchor and reporter for Spectrum News 1 and Spectrum SportsNet in Los Angeles.
