= Frédéric Schaub =

Swiss footballer (born 1987)

Personal information
- Full name: Frédéric Schaub
- Date of birth: 30 April 1987 (age 39)
- Height: 1.87 m (6 ft 2 in)
- Position: Defender

Senior career*
Years	Team	Apps	(Gls)
2006–2007	FC Brugg	16	(2)
2007–2008	FC Wohlen	35	(3)
2008–2010	FC Aarau	3	(0)
2010–2015	FC Muri		
- * Club domestic league appearances and goals as of 2020

Frédéric Schaub (born 30 April 1987) is a Swiss football defender currently without a club.

Schaub rose to public relevance due to his very low FIFA 10 rating of 38, making him the second lowest rated player in the game (and in the whole FIFA franchise), second only to Ian Baraclough (who has 36 in his base card and 25 in his special card).
