= Stefan Schaub =

German music teacher and scholar (born 1952)

Stefan Schaub (born 27 April 1952 in Oberkirch) is a German music teacher and scholar.

== Life ==
Schaub studied pedagogy, musicology, and psychology (diploma 1979) and did a doctorate 1982 in music education under Prof Sigrid Abel-Struth in Frankfurt am Main. From 1980 until 1984 he was research assistant at the Institute of Pedagogic Psychology at Frankfurt University. From 1975 until 1981 he was member of the board of the German Society of Music Therapy (DGMT e.V.)

In 1983 he founded the "Seminare für Klassische Musik" ("Seminar for Classical Music") as an institution for musical adult education. The seminars are directed to laymen interested in music, and consist of an overview on historical personalities and epochs and are dedicated to the inspection and analysis of musical masterpieces.

== Publications ==
=== Books ===
- Ewig fernes Paradies. Ein Weg zur Klassischen Musik. Schweizer Verlagshaus, Zürich 1988
- Erlebnis Musik. Eine kleine Musikgeschichte. dtv/Bärenreiter, München/Kassel 1993, ISBN 3-423-30384-0
- Schluß mit Lampenfieber. Ruhe in Streßsituationen. Con Brio, Regensburg 1996
- Musikpädagogik als freier Beruf. Üben & Musizieren, 1998
- Autogenes Training und klassische Musik. Patmos, Düsseldorf 1999
- Hören mit Begeisterung. Ein Weg zum aktiven Musik-Erleben. Atlantis, Mainz 1997 (dazu ein Set mit 4 CDs mit allen Musikbeispielen), ISBN 3-254-00998-3
- Zwanzig Minuten Autogenes Training mit Musik. Eine Basisübung für den Alltag. SfKM 2007, ISBN 978-3-00-020454-8

=== Booklets ===
- Klassik Kennen Lernen. (CD-Reihe mit Begleitheften). Naxos, Münster 2003–2006:
  - Faszination Klavierkonzert, ISBN 3-89816-133-1
  - Die Sonatenform bei Mozart und Beethoven, ISBN 3-89816-134-X
  - Das Genie Bachs in der Matthäus-Passion, ISBN 3-89816-135-8
  - Beethoven: Die Revolution in seinen Sinfonien, ISBN 3-89816-148-X
  - Musikgeschichte in Klangbeispielen, ISBN 3-89816-168-4
  - Musikalische Architektur: Bach (Passacaglia) & Ravel (Bolero), ISBN 3-89816-192-7
  - Juwelen der Inspiration: Die Klavierkonzerte von Mozart, ISBN 3-89816-193-5
  - Klangmagier der Romantik, ISBN 3-89816-194-3
  - Franz Liszts h-Moll-Sonate auf den Spuren von Schuberts Wandererfantasie, ISBN 3-89816-195-1
  - Faszination Schostakowitsch, ISBN 3-89816-273-7

=== Articles ===
- Experimenteller Wirkungsvergleich von Tongeschlecht und Tempo als Indikatoren musikalischer Stimmung. Musiktherapeutische Umschau; 1, 45–56, 1980
- Untersuchung zum Zusammenhang zwischen Grundstimmung und Musik-Erleben unter klinisch-musikpsychologischem Aspekt. Zeitschrift für Klinische Psychologie und Psychotherapie; 28, 134–142, 1980
- Musik im autogenen Training. Eine experimentelle Untersuchung. Psychotherapie – Psychosomatik – Medizinische Psychologie; 30, 286–292, 1980
- Kleine empirische Untersuchung zur Wirksamkeit handlungsorientierten Musikunterrichts auf den affektiven Lernzielbereich. (zusammen mit B. Schaub). In: K.-E. Behne: Musikpädagogische Forschung, Bd. 1. Laaber: Laaber 1980, S. 84–95
- Der doppelte Aspekt des Musikerlebens als Gegenstand einer interdisziplinären Musikpsychologie. Die Musikforschung; 33, 323–327, 1980
- Zum Einfluß situativer Befindlichkeit auf die musikalische Erwartung. Musikth. Umschau; 2, 267–275, 1981
- Musikalische Grundeinstellung als Indikator zur Schätzung von Musikalität. In: Gieseler, W. & Klinkhammer, R. (eds.): Forschung in der Musikerziehung 1981. Mainz: Schott 1982, S. 151–155
- Wie schwer ist „schwere“ Musik? Musica 36; 518–521, 1982
- Die Skala zur musikalischen Grundeinstellung (SMG) Diagnostica; 29, 172–180, 1983
- Skala zur Einstellung gegenüber Klassischer Musik (SKM). Musikth. Umschau; 5, 19–24, 1984
- Methodenbeiträge zur Erforschung des Musik-Lernens. Die Erfassung musikalischen Erlebens und musikalischer Einstellungen und deren Bedeutung für das Konzept der Musikalität. (Musikpädagogik. Forschung und Lehre, Bd. 24, ed. S. Abel-Struth). Mainz: Schott 1984
- Mozart und das Tourette-Syndrom. Mozarts Persönlichkeitsstruktur im Lichte der Neuropsychologie. Acta mozartiana, 41. Jahrgang, Heft I/II, March 1994

== Sources ==
- Interview mit Dr. Schaub und weiterführende Links (in German)
