= John Earl Shoaff =

American entrepreneur (1916–1965)

John Earl Shoaff (March 21, 1916 - September 6, 1965) was an American entrepreneur and motivational speaker. Shoaff was president and board chairman of the Nutri-Bio Corporation, a Multi-level marketing organization which sold vitamin, mineral, and protein dietary food supplements.

== Early life ==
Shoaff was born March 21, 1916, in Plain Grove, Pennsylvania. Shoaff was born with a heart condition, and was not expected to survive childhood. At age 14 during the Great Depression, Shoaff left school in the ninth grade to work in a local dry cleaners, working his way up to manager.

During World War II Shoaff was not able to enlist due to his heart condition, and instead worked overseas as a medical volunteer with the American Field Service. After the war, he was told that this combat duty had caused further heart complications. He married his sweetheart Flossie, and went on to open his own dry cleaning business which he named "Earl's Cleaners" in Michigan.

In 1950, Shoaff and his wife decided to sell the dry cleaning business and move with his parents to Long Beach, California. Shoaff got a job at Desmond's department store pressing suits.

In 1953, the couple's next door neighbor, Marvin Wendt, took them to a success lecture in Long Beach given by J. B. (James Breckenridge) Jones. Jones toured the country giving lectures on how anyone who applied the "laws of success" could be, do and have anything they wanted. Jones had founded a nutritional supplement company called "The AbundaVita Corporation of America". He also wrote a book in the 1950s about his philosophy titled "If You Can Count to Four." Shoaff joined AbundaVita, and was eventually promoted to VP of Sales. Shoaff began touring the country giving speeches on Jones' success philosophy and recruiting others into AbundaVita. At one of these seminars Jim Rohn came to hear Shoaff speak, and signed up as a distributor of AbundaVita's product line.

In July, 1957, Shoaff along with Rich Schnackenberg and Harry Ebbert, left Abundavita and started The Nutri-Bio Corporation. The company grew to six million dollars per month in sales with 115,000 distributors in the USA and Canada, and Shoaff became a multi-millionaire.

On September 5, 1965, Earl Shoaff died from complications of pneumonia.
