= Shoaf =

Shoaf is a surname. Notable people with this surname are:

- Jason Shoaf (born 1979), American politician
- Rachel Shoaf (born 1996), American convicted of murder in 2013

== Other uses ==
- Henry Shoaf Farm, North Carolina
- Shoaf Historic District, Fayette County, Pennsylvania
- Shoaf, Pennsylvania, a village in Georges Township, Fayette County, Pennsylvania

== See also ==
- Shoaff (surname)
