= A. O. L. Atkin =

British-American mathematician

- Born: 31 July 1925
- Died: 28 December 2008 (aged 83); Maywood, Illinois, US
- Education: University of Cambridge (PhD)
- Known for: Schoof–Elkies–Atkin algorithm; Sieve of Atkin
- Scientific career
- Fields: Computational number theory
- Workplaces: Bletchley Park; Durham University; Atlas Computer Laboratory; University of Illinois at Chicago
- Doctoral advisor: John Littlewood

Arthur Oliver Lonsdale Atkin (31 July 1925 – 28 December 2008), who published under the name A. O. L. Atkin, was a British mathematician.

After matriculating from Cambridge University at the age of 16, Atkin worked at Bletchley Park cracking German codes during World War 2. He received his Ph.D. in 1952 from the University of Cambridge, where he was one of John Littlewood's research students. In 1952 he moved to Durham University as a lecturer in mathematics. During 1964–1970, he worked at the Atlas Computer Laboratory at Chilton, computing modular functions. Toward the end of his life, he was Professor Emeritus of mathematics at the University of Illinois at Chicago.

Atkin, along with Noam Elkies, extended Schoof's algorithm to create the Schoof–Elkies–Atkin algorithm. Together with Daniel J. Bernstein, he developed the sieve of Atkin.

Atkin is also known for his work on properties of the integer partition function and the monster module. He was a vocal fan of using computers in mathematics, so long as the end goal was theoretical advance: "Each new generation of machines makes feasible a whole new range of computations; provided mathematicians pursue these rather than merely break old records for old sports, computation will have a significant part to play in the development of mathematics."

Atkin died of nosocomial pneumonia on 28 December 2008, in Maywood, Illinois.

== Selected publications ==
- Atkin, A. O. L.; Lehner, J. (1970), "Hecke operators on Γ_{0} (m)", Mathematische Annalen, 185 (2): 134–160, doi:10.1007/BF01359701, ISSN 0025-5831, MR 0268123, S2CID 120159177
- Atkin, A. O. L. and Morain, F. "Elliptic Curves and Primality Proving." Math. Comput. 61, 29–68, 1993.
- Atkin, A. O. L. and Bernstein, D. J. Prime sieves using binary quadratic forms, Math. Comp. 73 (2004), 1023–1030..

== See also ==
- Atkin–Goldwasser–Kilian–Morain certificates
- Atkin–Lehner theory
- Elliptic curve primality proving
