= Lucas–Carmichael number =

Type of positive composite integer

In mathematics, a Lucas–Carmichael number is a positive composite integer n such that

1. If p is a prime factor of n, then p + 1 is a factor of n + 1;
2. n is odd and square-free.

The first condition resembles Korselt's criterion for Carmichael numbers, where −1 is replaced with +1. The second condition eliminates from consideration some trivial cases like cubes of prime numbers, such as 8 or 27, which otherwise would be Lucas–Carmichael numbers (since n^{3} + 1 = (n + 1)(n^{2} − n + 1) is always divisible by n + 1).

They are named after Édouard Lucas and Robert Carmichael.

The first few Lucas–Carmichael numbers are:

399, 935, 2015, 2915, 4991, 5719, 7055, 8855, 12719, 18095, 20705... (sequence A006972 in the OEIS)

== Properties ==
The smallest Lucas–Carmichael number is 399 = 3 × 7 × 19. It is easy to verify that 3+1, 7+1, and 19+1 are all factors of 399+1 = 400.

The smallest Lucas–Carmichael number with 4 factors is 8855 = 5 × 7 × 11 × 23.

The smallest Lucas–Carmichael number with 5 factors is 588455 = 5 × 7 × 17 × 23 × 43.

It is not known whether any Lucas–Carmichael number is also a Carmichael number.

Thomas Wright proved in 2016 that there are infinitely many Lucas–Carmichael numbers. If we let $N(X)$ denote the number of Lucas–Carmichael numbers up to $X$, Wright showed that there exists a positive constant $K$ such that

$N(X) \gg X^{K/\left( \log\log \log X\right)^2}$.

== See also ==
- Carmichael number
- Lucas number
- Lucas pseudoprime
- Lucas sequence
