= Euler pseudoprime =

Odd composite number which passes the given congruence

In mathematics, an odd composite integer n is called an Euler pseudoprime to base a, if a and n are coprime, and

$$a^{(n-1)/2} \equiv \pm  1\pmod{n}$$

(where mod refers to the modulo operation).

The motivation for this definition is the fact that all prime numbers p satisfy the above equation which can be deduced from Fermat's little theorem. Fermat's theorem asserts that if p is prime, and coprime to a, then a^{p−1} ≡ 1 (mod p). Suppose that p>2 is prime, then p can be expressed as 2q + 1 where q is an integer. Thus, a^{(2q+1) − 1} ≡ 1 (mod p), which means that a^{2q} − 1 ≡ 0 (mod p). This can be factored as (a^{q} − 1)(a^{q} + 1) ≡ 0 (mod p), which is equivalent to a^{(p−1)/2} ≡ ±1 (mod p).

The equation can be tested rather quickly, which can be used for probabilistic primality testing. These tests are twice as strong as tests based on Fermat's little theorem.

== Absolute Euler Pseudoprimes ==
Every Euler pseudoprime is also a Fermat pseudoprime. It is not possible to produce a definite test of primality based on whether a number is an Euler pseudoprime because there exist absolute Euler pseudoprimes, numbers which are Euler pseudoprimes to every base relatively prime to themselves. The absolute Euler pseudoprimes are a subset of the absolute Fermat pseudoprimes, or Carmichael numbers, and the smallest absolute Euler pseudoprime is 1729.

== Relation to Euler–Jacobi pseudoprimes ==
A slightly stronger test uses the Jacobi symbol to predict which of the two results will be found. The resultant Euler-Jacobi probable prime test verifies that

$$a^{(n-1)/2} \equiv \left(\frac{a}{n}\right) \neq 0 \pmod n.$$

As with the basic Euler test, a and n are required to be coprime, but that test is included in the computation of the Jacobi symbol (a/n), whose value equals 0 if the values are not coprime. This slightly stronger test is called simply an Euler probable prime test by some authors. See, for example, page 115 of the book by Koblitz listed below, page 90 of the book by Riesel, or page 1003 of.

As an example of this test's increased strength, 341 is an Euler pseudoprime to the base 2, but not an Euler-Jacobi pseudoprime. Even more significantly, there are no absolute Euler–Jacobi pseudoprimes.

A strong probable prime test is even stronger than the Euler-Jacobi test but takes the same computational effort. Because of this, prime-testing software is usually based on the strong test.

== Implementation in Lua ==
In the programming language Lua, an implementation is:

function EulerTest(k)
  a = 2
  if k == 1 then return false
  elseif k == 2 then return true
  else
    m = modPow(a,(k-1)/2,k)
    if (m == 1) or (m == k-1) then
      return true
    else
      return false
    end
  end
end

== Examples ==
n	Euler pseudoprimes to base n
1	All odd composite numbers: 9, 15, 21, 25, 27, 33, 35, 39, 45, 49, 51, 55, 57, 63, 65, 69, 75, 77, 81, 85, 87, 91, 93, 95, 99, ...
2	341, 561, 1105, 1729, 1905, 2047, 2465, 3277, 4033, 4681, 5461, 6601, 8321, 8481, ...
3	121, 703, 1541, 1729, 1891, 2465, 2821, 3281, 4961, 7381, 8401, 8911, ...
4	341, 561, 645, 1105, 1387, 1729, 1905, 2047, 2465, 2701, 2821, 3277, 4033, 4369, 4371, 4681, 5461, 6601, 7957, 8321, 8481, 8911, ...
5	217, 781, 1541, 1729, 5461, 5611, 6601, 7449, 7813, ...
6	185, 217, 301, 481, 1111, 1261, 1333, 1729, 2465, 2701, 3421, 3565, 3589, 3913, 5713, 6533, 8365, ...
7	25, 325, 703, 817, 1825, 2101, 2353, 2465, 3277, 4525, 6697, 8321, ...
8	9, 21, 65, 105, 133, 273, 341, 481, 511, 561, 585, 1001, 1105, 1281, 1417, 1541, 1661, 1729, 1905, 2047, 2465, 2501, 3201, 3277, 3641, 4033, 4097, 4641, 4681, 4921, 5461, 6305, 6533, 6601, 7161, 8321, 8481, 9265, 9709, ...
9	91, 121, 671, 703, 949, 1105, 1541, 1729, 1891, 2465, 2665, 2701, 2821, 3281, 3367, 3751, 4961, 5551, 6601, 7381, 8401, 8911, ...
10	9, 33, 91, 481, 657, 1233, 1729, 2821, 2981, 4187, 5461, 6533, 6541, 6601, 7777, 8149, 8401, ...
11	133, 305, 481, 645, 793, 1729, 2047, 2257, 2465, 4577, 4921, 5041, 5185, 8113, ...
12	65, 91, 133, 145, 247, 377, 385, 1649, 1729, 2041, 2233, 2465, 2821, 3553, 6305, 8911, 9073, ...
13	21, 85, 105, 561, 1099, 1785, 2465, 5149, 5185, 7107, 8841, 8911, 9577, 9637, ...
14	15, 65, 481, 781, 793, 841, 985, 1541, 2257, 2465, 2561, 2743, 3277, 5185, 5713, 6533, 6541, 7171, 7449, 7585, 8321, 9073, ...
15	341, 1477, 1541, 1687, 1729, 1921, 3277, 6541, 9073, ...
16	15, 85, 91, 341, 435, 451, 561, 645, 703, 1105, 1247, 1271, 1387, 1581, 1695, 1729, 1891, 1905, 2047, 2071, 2465, 2701, 2821, 3133, 3277, 3367, 3683, 4033, 4369, 4371, 4681, 4795, 4859, 5461, 5551, 6601, 6643, 7957, 8321, 8481, 8695, 8911, 9061, 9131, 9211, 9605, 9919, ...
17	9, 91, 145, 781, 1111, 1305, 1729, 2149, 2821, 4033, 4187, 5365, 5833, 6697, 7171, ...
18	25, 49, 65, 133, 325, 343, 425, 1105, 1225, 1369, 1387, 1729, 1921, 2149, 2465, 2977, 4577, 5725, 5833, 5941, 6305, 6517, 6601, 7345, ...
19	9, 45, 49, 169, 343, 561, 889, 905, 1105, 1661, 1849, 2353, 2465, 2701, 3201, 4033, 4681, 5461, 5713, 6541, 6697, 7957, 8145, 8281, 8401, 9997, ...
20	21, 57, 133, 671, 889, 1281, 1653, 1729, 1891, 2059, 2413, 2761, 3201, 5461, 5473, 5713, 5833, 6601, 6817, 7999, ...
21	65, 221, 703, 793, 1045, 1105, 2465, 3781, 5185, 5473, 6541, 7363, 8965, 9061, ...
22	21, 69, 91, 105, 161, 169, 345, 485, 1183, 1247, 1541, 1729, 2041, 2047, 2413, 2465, 2821, 3241, 3801, 5551, 7665, 9453, ...
23	33, 169, 265, 341, 385, 481, 553, 1065, 1271, 1729, 2321, 2465, 2701, 2821, 3097, 4033, 4081, 4345, 4371, 4681, 5149, 6533, 6541, 7189, 7957, 8321, 8651, 8745, 8911, 9805, ...
24	25, 175, 553, 805, 949, 1541, 1729, 1825, 1975, 2413, 2465, 2701, 3781, 4537, 6931, 7501, 9085, 9361, ...
25	217, 561, 781, 1541, 1729, 1891, 2821, 4123, 5461, 5611, 5731, 6601, 7449, 7813, 8029, 8911, 9881, ...
26	9, 25, 27, 45, 133, 217, 225, 475, 561, 589, 703, 925, 1065, 2465, 3325, 3385, 3565, 3825, 4741, 4921, 5041, 5425, 6697, 8029, 9073, ...
27	65, 121, 133, 259, 341, 365, 481, 703, 1001, 1541, 1649, 1729, 1891, 2465, 2821, 2981, 2993, 3281, 4033, 4745, 4921, 4961, 5461, 6305, 6533, 7381, 7585, 8321, 8401, 8911, 9809, 9841, 9881, ...
28	9, 27, 145, 261, 361, 529, 785, 1305, 1431, 2041, 2413, 2465, 3201, 3277, 4553, 4699, 5149, 7065, 8321, 8401, 9841, ...
29	15, 21, 91, 105, 341, 469, 481, 793, 871, 1729, 1897, 2105, 2257, 2821, 4371, 4411, 5149, 5185, 5473, 5565, 6097, 7161, 8321, 8401, 8421, 8841, ...
30	49, 133, 217, 341, 403, 469, 589, 637, 871, 901, 931, 1273, 1537, 1729, 2059, 2077, 2821, 3097, 3277, 4081, 4097, 5729, 6031, 6061, 6097, 6409, 6817, 7657, 8023, 8029, 8401, 9881, ...

== Least Euler pseudoprime to base n ==
n	Least EPSP	n	Least EPSP	n	Least EPSP	n	Least EPSP
1	9	33	545	65	33	97	21
2	341	34	21	66	65	98	9
3	121	35	9	67	33	99	25
4	341	36	35	68	25	100	9
5	217	37	9	69	35	101	25
6	185	38	39	70	69	102	133
7	25	39	133	71	9	103	51
8	9	40	39	72	85	104	15
9	91	41	21	73	9	105	451
10	9	42	451	74	15	106	15
11	133	43	21	75	91	107	9
12	65	44	9	76	15	108	91
13	21	45	133	77	39	109	9
14	15	46	9	78	77	110	111
15	341	47	65	79	39	111	55
16	15	48	49	80	9	112	65
17	9	49	25	81	91	113	21
18	25	50	21	82	9	114	115
19	9	51	25	83	21	115	57
20	21	52	51	84	85	116	9
21	65	53	9	85	21	117	49
22	21	54	55	86	65	118	9
23	33	55	9	87	133	119	15
24	25	56	33	88	87	120	77
25	217	57	25	89	9	121	15
26	9	58	57	90	91	122	33
27	65	59	15	91	9	123	85
28	9	60	341	92	21	124	25
29	15	61	15	93	25	125	9
30	49	62	9	94	57	126	25
31	15	63	341	95	141	127	9
32	25	64	9	96	65	128	49

== See also ==
- Probable prime
