= Somer–Lucas pseudoprime =

Type of odd composite number

In mathematics, specifically number theory, an odd and composite number N is a Somer–Lucas d-pseudoprime (with given d ≥ 1) if there exists a nondegenerate Lucas sequence $U(P,Q)$ with the discriminant $D=P^2-4Q,$ such that $\gcd(N,D)=1$ and the rank appearance of N in the sequence U(P, Q) is

$$\frac{1}{d}\left(N-\left(\frac{D}{N}\right)\right),$$

where $\left(\frac{D}{N}\right)$ is the Jacobi symbol.

== Applications ==
Unlike the standard Lucas pseudoprimes, there is no known efficient primality test using the Lucas d-pseudoprimes. Hence they are not generally used for computation.

== See also ==
Lawrence Somer, in his 1985 thesis, also defined the Somer d-pseudoprimes. They are described in brief on page 117 of Ribenboim 1996.
