= QFT =

QFT may stand for:

- Quantum field theory, the theory of quantum mechanics applied to fields
- Quantum Fourier transform, a Fourier transform acting on quantum bits
- Quadratic Frobenius test, a primality test
- QuantiFERON, a test for tuberculosis infection or latent tuberculosis
- Quantitative feedback theory
- Queen's Film Theatre, a cinema in Northern Ireland
