= Édouard Lucas =

French mathematician (1842–1891)

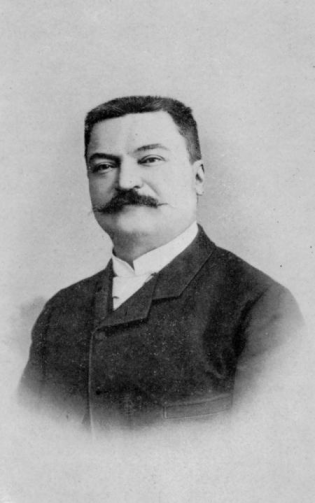
- Born: 4 April 1842; Amiens, France
- Died: 3 October 1891 (aged 49); Paris, France
- Education: École Normale Supérieure
- Known for: Lucas number Lucas sequence Lucas primality test Lucas–Lehmer primality test Lucas prime Lucas's theorem Genaille–Lucas rulers Ménage problem Tower of Hanoi
- Scientific career
- Fields: Mathematics

François Édouard Anatole Lucas (French pronunciation: [fʁɑ̃swa edwaʁ anatɔl lykɑ]; 4 April 1842 – 3 October 1891) was a French mathematician. Lucas is known for his study of the Fibonacci sequence and the Tower of Hanoi. The related Lucas sequences and Lucas numbers are named after him.

== Biography ==
Lucas was born in Amiens and educated at the École Normale Supérieure. He worked in the Paris Observatory and later became a professor of mathematics at the Lycée Saint Louis and the Lycée Charlemagne in Paris.

Lucas served as an artillery officer in the French Army during the Franco-Prussian War of 1870–1871.

In 1875, Lucas posed a challenge to prove that the only solution of the Diophantine equation

$$\sum_{n=1}^{N} n^2 = M^2\;$$

with N > 1 is when N = 24 and M = 70. This is known as the cannonball problem, since it can be visualized as the problem of taking a square arrangement of cannonballs on the ground and building a square pyramid out of them. It was not until 1918 that a proof (using elliptic functions) was found for this remarkable fact, which has relevance to the bosonic string theory in 26 dimensions. More recently, elementary proofs have been published.

He devised methods for testing the primality of numbers. In 1857, at age 15, Lucas began testing the primality of 2^{127} − 1, a number with 39 decimal digits, by hand, using Lucas sequences. In 1876, after 19 years of testing, he finally proved that 2^{127} − 1 is prime; it remained the largest known Mersenne prime for three-quarters of a century, and remains the largest prime number proved by hand. Later Derrick Henry Lehmer refined Lucas's primality tests and obtained the Lucas–Lehmer primality test.

He worked on the development of the umbral calculus.

Lucas is credited as the first to publish the Kempner function.

Lucas was also interested in recreational mathematics. He found an elegant binary solution to the Baguenaudier puzzle. He also invented the Tower of Hanoi puzzle in 1883, which he marketed under the nickname N. Claus de Siam, an anagram of Lucas d'Amiens, and published for the first time a description of the dots and boxes game in 1889, which he called la pipopipette.

At the banquet of the annual congress of the Association française pour l'avancement des sciences, a waiter dropped some crockery, and a piece of broken plate cut Lucas on the cheek. He died a few days later of a severe skin inflammation, probably caused by sepsis, at 49 years old.

== Works ==
- Recherches sur plusieurs ouvrages de Léonard de Pise et sur diverses questions d’arithmétique supérieure (1877)
- Récréations scientifiques (1880)
- Théorie des nombres, Tome Premier (1891)
- Récréations mathématiques (1894)
- L'arithmétique amusante (1895)

== See also ==
- Lucas pseudoprime
- Lucas–Carmichael number
- Pell–Lucas numbers
