= Fibonacci polynomials =

Sequence of polynomials defined recursively

In mathematics, the Fibonacci polynomials are a polynomial sequence which can be considered as a generalization of the Fibonacci numbers. The polynomials generated in a similar way from the Lucas numbers are called Lucas polynomials.

== Definition ==
These Fibonacci polynomials are defined by a recurrence relation:

$$F_n(x)= \begin{cases}
0, & \mbox{if } n =  0\\
1, & \mbox{if } n =  1\\
x F_{n - 1}(x) + F_{n - 2}(x),& \mbox{if }  n \geq 2
\end{cases}$$

The Lucas polynomials use the same recurrence with different starting values:

$$L_n(x) = \begin{cases}
2, & \mbox{if } n = 0 \\
x, & \mbox{if } n = 1 \\
x L_{n - 1}(x) + L_{n - 2}(x), & \mbox{if } n \geq 2.
\end{cases}$$

They can be defined for negative indices by

$$F_{-n}(x)=(-1)^{n-1}F_{n}(x),$$
$$L_{-n}(x)=(-1)^nL_{n}(x).$$

The Fibonacci polynomials form a sequence of orthogonal polynomials with $A_n=C_n=1$ and $B_n=0$.

== Examples ==
The first few Fibonacci polynomials are:

$$F_0(x)=0 \,$$
$$F_1(x)=1 \,$$
$$F_2(x)=x \,$$
$$F_3(x)=x^2+1 \,$$
$$F_4(x)=x^3+2x \,$$
$$F_5(x)=x^4+3x^2+1 \,$$
$$F_6(x)=x^5+4x^3+3x \,$$

The first few Lucas polynomials are:

$$L_0(x)=2 \,$$
$$L_1(x)=x \,$$
$$L_2(x)=x^2+2 \,$$
$$L_3(x)=x^3+3x \,$$
$$L_4(x)=x^4+4x^2+2 \,$$
$$L_5(x)=x^5+5x^3+5x \,$$
$$L_6(x)=x^6+6x^4+9x^2 + 2. \,$$

== Properties ==
- The degree of F_{n} is n − 1 and the degree of L_{n} is n.
- The Fibonacci and Lucas numbers are recovered by evaluating the polynomials at x = 1; Pell numbers are recovered by evaluating F_{n} at x = 2.
- The ordinary generating functions for the sequences are:
  $$\sum_{n=0}^\infty F_n(x) t^n = \frac{t}{1-xt-t^2}$$
  $$\sum_{n=0}^\infty L_n(x) t^n = \frac{2-xt}{1-xt-t^2}.$$
- The polynomials can be expressed in terms of Lucas sequences as
  $$F_n(x) = U_n(x,-1),\,$$
  $$L_n(x) = V_n(x,-1).\,$$
- They can also be expressed in terms of Chebyshev polynomials $\mathcal{T}_n(x)$ and $\mathcal{U}_n(x)$ as
  $$F_n(x) = i^{n-1}\cdot\mathcal{U}_{n-1}(\tfrac{-ix}2),\,$$
  $$L_n(x) = 2\cdot i^n\cdot\mathcal{T}_n(\tfrac{-ix}2),\,$$

where $i$ is the imaginary unit.

== Identities ==
As particular cases of Lucas sequences, Fibonacci polynomials satisfy a number of identities, such as

$$F_{m+n}(x)=F_{m+1}(x)F_n(x)+F_m(x)F_{n-1}(x)\,$$
$$L_{m+n}(x)=L_m(x)L_n(x)-(-1)^nL_{m-n}(x)\,$$
$$F_{n+1}(x)F_{n-1}(x)- F_n(x)^2=(-1)^n\,$$
$$F_{2n}(x)=F_n(x)L_n(x).\,$$

Closed form expressions, similar to Binet's formula are:

$$F_n(x)=\frac{\alpha(x)^n-\beta(x)^n}{\alpha(x)-\beta(x)},\,L_n(x)=\alpha(x)^n+\beta(x)^n,$$

where

$$\alpha(x)=\frac{x+\sqrt{x^2+4}}{2},\,\beta(x)=\frac{x-\sqrt{x^2+4}}{2}$$

are the solutions (in t) of

$$t^2-xt-1=0.\,$$

For Lucas Polynomials n > 0, we have

$$L_n(x)=\sum_{k=0}^{\lfloor n/2\rfloor} \frac{n}{n-k} \binom{n-k}{k} x^{n-2k}.$$

A relationship between the Fibonacci polynomials and the standard basis polynomials is given by

$$x^n=F_{n+1}(x)+\sum_{k=1}^{\lfloor n/2\rfloor}(-1)^k\left[\binom nk-\binom n{k-1}\right]F_{n+1-2k}(x).$$

For example,

$$x^4 = F_5(x)-3F_3(x)+2F_1(x)\,$$
$$x^5 = F_6(x)-4F_4(x)+5F_2(x)\,$$
$$x^6 = F_7(x)-5F_5(x)+9F_3(x)-5F_1(x)\,$$
$$x^7 = F_8(x)-6F_6(x)+14F_4(x)-14F_2(x)\,$$

== Combinatorial interpretation ==
The coefficients of the Fibonacci polynomials can be read off from a left-justified Pascal's triangle following the diagonals (shown in red). The sums of the coefficients are the Fibonacci numbers.

If F(n,k) is the coefficient of x^{k} in F_{n}(x), namely

$$F_n(x)=\sum_{k=0}^n F(n,k)x^k,\,$$

then F(n,k) is the number of ways an n−1 by 1 rectangle can be tiled with 2 by 1 dominoes and 1 by 1 squares so that exactly k squares are used. Equivalently, F(n,k) is the number of ways of writing n−1 as an ordered sum involving only 1 and 2, so that 1 is used exactly k times. For example F(6,3)=4 and 5 can be written in 4 ways, 1+1+1+2, 1+1+2+1, 1+2+1+1, 2+1+1+1, as a sum involving only 1 and 2 with 1 used 3 times. By counting the number of times 1 and 2 are both used in such a sum, it is evident that
$$F(n, k)=\begin{cases}\displaystyle\binom{\frac12(n+k-1)}{k} &\text{if }n \not\equiv k \pmod 2,\\[12pt]
0 &\text{else}.
\end{cases}$$

This gives a way of reading the coefficients from Pascal's triangle as shown on the right.
