= Lucas number =

Infinite integer series where the next number is the sum of the two preceding it

The Lucas spiral, made with quarter-arcs, is a good approximation of the golden spiral when its terms are large. However, when its terms become very small, the arc's radius decreases rapidly from 3 to 1 then increases from 1 to 2.

The Lucas sequence is an integer sequence named after the mathematician François Édouard Anatole Lucas (1842–1891), who studied both that sequence and the closely related Fibonacci sequence. Individual numbers in the Lucas sequence are known as Lucas numbers. Lucas numbers and Fibonacci numbers form complementary instances of Lucas sequences.

The Lucas sequence has the same recursive relationship as the Fibonacci sequence, where each term is the sum of the two previous terms, but with different starting values. This produces a sequence where the ratios of successive terms approach the golden ratio, and in fact the terms themselves are roundings of integer powers of the golden ratio. The sequence also has a variety of relationships with the Fibonacci numbers, like the fact that adding any two Fibonacci numbers two terms apart in the Fibonacci sequence results in the Lucas number in between.

The first few Lucas numbers are

2, 1, 3, 4, 7, 11, 18, 29, 47, 76, 123, 199, 322, 521, 843, 1364, 2207, 3571, 5778, 9349, ... . (sequence A000032 in the OEIS)

which coincides for example with the number of independent vertex sets for cyclic graphs $C_n$ of length $n\geq2$.

== Definition ==
As with the Fibonacci numbers, each Lucas number is defined to be the sum of its two immediately previous terms, thereby forming a Fibonacci integer sequence. The first two Lucas numbers are $L_0=2$ and $L_1=1$, which differs from the first two Fibonacci numbers $F_0=0$ and $F_1=1$. Though closely related in definition, Lucas and Fibonacci numbers exhibit distinct properties.

The Lucas numbers may thus be defined as follows:

$$L_n :=
\begin{cases}
2               & \text{if } n = 0; \\
1               & \text{if } n = 1; \\
L_{n-1}+L_{n-2} & \text{if } n > 1.
\end{cases}$$

(where n belongs to the natural numbers)

All Fibonacci-like integer sequences appear in shifted form as a row of the Wythoff array; the Fibonacci sequence itself is the first row and the Lucas sequence is the second row. Also like all Fibonacci-like integer sequences, the ratio between two consecutive Lucas numbers converges to the golden ratio.

== Extension to negative integers ==
Using $L_{n-2}=L_{n}-L_{n-1}$, one can extend the Lucas numbers to negative integers to obtain a doubly infinite sequence:

..., −11, 7, −4, 3, −1, 2, 1, 3, 4, 7, 11, ... (terms $L_n$ for $-5\leq{}n\leq5$ are shown).

The formula for terms with negative indices in this sequence is

$$L_{-n}=(-1)^nL_n.\!$$

== Relationship to Fibonacci numbers ==
The first identity expressed visually

The Lucas numbers are related to the Fibonacci numbers by many identities. Among these are the following:

- $L_n = F_{n+1}+F_{n-1} = F_{n+2}-F_{n-2}.$
- $L_{n+k} = L_{n+1}F_k + L_n F_{k-1}.$
- $F_{n+k} = L_k F_n - (-1)^k F_{n-k};$ in particular when $k=n,$ $F_{2n} = L_n F_n.$
- $2F_{n+k} = L_n F_k + L_k F_n.$
- $L_{2n} = 5 F_n^2 + 2(-1)^n = L_n^2 - 2(-1)^n$, so $\lim_{n\to\infty} \frac{L_n}{F_n}=\sqrt{5}.$
- $L_n - \sqrt{5} F_n = \frac{2}{(-\varphi)^n} \to 0.$
- $L_{n+k} - (-1)^k L_{n-k} = 5 F_n F_k$; in particular when $k=1,$ $5F_n = L_{n+1}+L_{n-1} = 2L_{n+1} - L_n = L_n + 2L_{n-1},$ while when $k=n,$ the identity above for $L_{2n}$ is obtained.

Their closed formula is given as:

$$L_n = \varphi^n + (1-\varphi)^{n}
= \varphi^n + (-\varphi)^{-n}
= \left({ 1+ \sqrt{5} \over 2}\right)^n + \left({ 1- \sqrt{5} \over 2}\right)^n ,$$

where $\varphi$ is the golden ratio. For $n>1$ the magnitude of the term $(1-\varphi)^n$ is less than 1/2, therefore $L_n$ is the closest integer to $\varphi^n$ or, equivalently, the integer part of $\varphi^n+1/2$, also written as $\lfloor \varphi^n+1/2 \rfloor$.

Combining the above with Binet's formula,

$$F_n = \frac{\varphi^n - (1-\varphi)^n}{\sqrt 5} = \frac{\varphi^n - (-\varphi)^{-n}}{\sqrt 5} \, ,$$

a formula for $\varphi^n$ is obtained:

$$\varphi^n = {L_n + F_n \sqrt 5 \over 2}\, .$$

For integers n ≥ 2, we also get:

$$\varphi^n = L_n - (1-\varphi)^n = L_n - (-1)^n L_n^{-1} - L_n^{-3} + R$$

with remainder R satisfying

$$\vert R \vert < 3 L_n^{-5}.$$

== Lucas identities ==
Many of the Fibonacci identities have parallels in Lucas numbers. For example, the Cassini identity becomes

$$L_n^2 - L_{n-1}L_{n+1} = (-1)^{n}5$$

Also

$$\sum_{k=0}^n L_k = L_{n+2} - 1$$

$$\sum_{k=0}^n L_k^2 = L_nL_{n+1} + 2$$

$$2L_{n-1}^2 + L_n^2 = L_{2n+1} + 5F_{n-2}^2$$

where $\textstyle F_n=\frac{L_{n-1}+L_{n+1}}{5}$.

$$L_n^k = \sum_{j=0}^{\lfloor \frac{k}{2} \rfloor} (-1)^{nj} \binom{k}{j} L'_{(k-2j)n}$$

where $L'_n=L_n$ except for $L'_0=1$.

For example if n is odd, $L_n^3 = L'_{3n}-3L'_n$ and $L_n^4 = L'_{4n}-4L'_{2n}+6L'_0$

Checking, $L_3=4, 4^3=64=76-3(4)$, and $256=322-4(18)+6$

== Generating function ==
The ordinary generating function of the sequence of Lucas numbers is the power series

$$\Phi(x) = \sum_{k=0}^\infty L_k x^k = 2 + x + 3x^2 + 4x^3 + 7x^4 + 11x^5 + \cdots.$$

This series is convergent for any complex number $x$ satisfying $|x| < 1/\varphi \approx 0.618,$ and its sum has a simple closed form:
$$\Phi(x)=\frac{2-x}{1-x-x^2}.$$

This can be proved by multiplying by $(1-x-x^2)$:
$$\begin{align}
(1 - x- x^2) \Phi(x)
&= \sum_{k=0}^{\infty} L_k x^k - \sum_{k=0}^{\infty} L_k x^{k+1} - \sum_{k=0}^{\infty} L_k x^{k+2} \\
&= \sum_{k=0}^{\infty} L_k x^k - \sum_{k=1}^{\infty} L_{k-1} x^k - \sum_{k=2}^{\infty} L_{k-2} x^k \\
&= 2x^0 + 1x^1 - 2x^1 + \sum_{k=2}^{\infty} (L_k - L_{k-1} - L_{k-2}) x^k \\
&= 2 - x,
\end{align}$$
where all terms involving $x^k$ for $k \ge 2$ cancel out because of the defining Lucas numbers recurrence relation.

$\Phi\!\left(-\frac{1}{x}\right)$ gives the generating function for the negative indexed Lucas numbers, $\sum_{n = 0}^\infty (-1)^nL_nx^{-n} = \sum_{n = 0}^\infty L_{-n}x^{-n}$, and

$$\Phi\!\left(-\frac{1}{x}\right) = \frac{x + 2x^2}{1 - x - x^2}$$

$\Phi(x)$ satisfies the functional equation

$$\Phi(x) - \Phi\!\left(-\frac{1}{x}\right) = 2$$

As the generating function for the Fibonacci numbers is given by

$$s(x) = \frac{x}{1 - x - x^2}$$

we have

$$s(x) + \Phi(x) = \frac{2}{1 - x - x^2}$$

which proves that

$$F_n + L_n = 2F_{n+1},$$

and

$$5s(x) + \Phi(x) = \frac2x\Phi(-\frac1x) = 2\frac{1}{1 - x - x^2} + 4\frac{x}{1 - x - x^2}$$

proves that

$$5F_n + L_n = 2L_{n+1}$$

The partial fraction decomposition is given by

$$\Phi(x) = \frac{1}{1 - \phi x} + \frac{1}{1 - \psi x}$$

where $\phi = \frac{1 + \sqrt{5}}{2}$ is the golden ratio and $\psi = \frac{1 - \sqrt{5}}{2}$ is its conjugate.

This can be used to prove the generating function, as

$$\sum_{n = 0}^\infty L_nx^n = \sum_{n = 0}^\infty (\phi^n + \psi^n)x^n = \sum_{n = 0}^\infty \phi^nx^n + \sum_{n = 0}^\infty \psi^nx^n = \frac{1}{1 - \phi x} + \frac{1}{1 - \psi x} = \Phi(x)$$

Using $x$ equal to any of 0.01, 0.001, 0.0001, etc. lays out the first Lucas numbers in the decimal expansion of $\Phi(x)$. For example, $\Phi(0.001) = \frac{1.999}{0.998999} = \frac{1999000}{998999} = 2.001003004007011018029047\ldots.$

== Congruence relations ==
If $F_n\geq 5$ is a Fibonacci number then no Lucas number is divisible by $F_n$.

The Lucas numbers satisfy Gauss congruence. This implies that $L_n$ is congruent to 1 modulo $n$ if $n$ is prime. The composite values of $n$ which satisfy this property are known as Fibonacci pseudoprimes.

$L_n-L_{n-4}$ is congruent to 0 modulo 5.

== Relationships with prime numbers ==
A Lucas prime is a Lucas number that is prime. The first few Lucas primes are

2, 3, 7, 11, 29, 47, 199, 521, 2207, 3571, 9349, 3010349, 54018521, 370248451, 6643838879, ... (sequence A005479 in the OEIS).

As of September 2015, the largest confirmed Lucas prime is L_{148091}, which has 30950 decimal digits. As of August 2022, the largest known Lucas probable prime is L_{5466311}, with 1,142,392 decimal digits.

If L_{n} is prime then n is 0, prime, or a power of 2. L_{2^{m}} is prime for m = 1, 2, 3, and 4 and no other known values of m.

Every prime number divides some Fibonacci number. By contrast, there are infinitely many primes that do not divide any Lucas number. More precisely, the set of primes that divides at least one Lucas number has natural density 2/3 relative to the set of all primes, so that 1/3 of all prime numbers do not divide any Lucas number.

== Lucas polynomials ==
In the same way as Fibonacci polynomials are derived from the Fibonacci numbers, the Lucas polynomials $L_{n}(x)$ are a polynomial sequence derived from the Lucas numbers.

== Continued fractions for powers of the golden ratio ==
For all but the smallest values of n, the integer L_{n} very closely approximates the n-th power of the golden ratio, $\varphi^n$. Furthermore, close rational approximations for powers of the golden ratio can be obtained from their continued fractions.

For positive integers n, the continued fractions are:

$$\varphi^{2n-1} = [L_{2n-1}; L_{2n-1}, L_{2n-1}, L_{2n-1}, \ldots]$$
$$\varphi^{2n} = [L_{2n}-1; 1, L_{2n}-2, 1, L_{2n}-2, 1, L_{2n}-2, 1, \ldots]$$.

For example:

$$\varphi^5 = [11; 11, 11, 11, \ldots]$$

is the limit of

$$\frac{11}{1}, \frac{122}{11}, \frac{1353}{122}, \frac{15005}{1353}, \ldots$$

with the error in each term being about 1% of the error in the previous term; and

$$\varphi^6 = [18 - 1; 1, 18 - 2, 1, 18 - 2, 1, 18 - 2, 1, \ldots] = [17; 1, 16, 1, 16, 1, 16, 1, \ldots]$$

is the limit of

$$\frac{17}{1}, \frac{18}{1}, \frac{305}{17}, \frac{323}{18}, \frac{5473}{305}, \frac{5796}{323}, \frac{98209}{5473}, \frac{104005}{5796}, \ldots$$

with the error in each term being about 0.3% that of the second previous term.

== Applications ==
Lucas numbers are the second most common pattern in sunflowers after Fibonacci numbers, when clockwise and counter-clockwise spirals are counted, according to an analysis of 657 sunflowers in 2016.

== See also ==
- Generalizations of Fibonacci numbers
