= Lucas sequence =

Certain constant-recursive integer sequences

In mathematics, the Lucas sequences $U_n(P,Q)$ and $V_n(P, Q)$ are certain constant-recursive integer sequences that satisfy the recurrence relation

$$x_n = P \cdot x_{n - 1} - Q \cdot x_{n - 2}$$

where $P$ and $Q$ are fixed integers. Although $U_n(P, Q)$ and $V_n(P, Q)$ satisfy the same recurrence relation, they differ on the values of their first two elements and thus differ for subsequent elements as well. Any sequence satisfying this recurrence relation can be represented as a linear combination of the Lucas sequences $U_n(P, Q)$ and $V_n(P, Q).$

More generally, Lucas sequences $U_n(P, Q)$ and $V_n(P, Q)$ represent sequences of polynomials in $P$ and $Q$ with integer coefficients.

Famous examples of Lucas sequences include the Fibonacci numbers, Mersenne numbers, Pell numbers, Lucas numbers, Jacobsthal numbers, and a superset of Fermat numbers (see below). Lucas sequences are named after the French mathematician Édouard Lucas.

== Recurrence relations ==
Given two integer parameters $P$ and $Q$, the Lucas sequences of the first kind $U_n(P,Q)$ and of the second kind $V_n(P,Q)$ are defined by the recurrence relations:

$$\begin{align}
U_0(P,Q)&=0, \\
U_1(P,Q)&=1, \\
U_n(P,Q)&=P\cdot U_{n-1}(P,Q)-Q\cdot U_{n-2}(P,Q) \mbox{  for }n>1,
\end{align}$$

and

$$\begin{align}
V_0(P,Q)&=2, \\
V_1(P,Q)&=P, \\
V_n(P,Q)&=P\cdot V_{n-1}(P,Q)-Q\cdot V_{n-2}(P,Q) \mbox{  for }n>1.
\end{align}$$

It is not hard to show that for $n>0$,

$$\begin{align}
U_n(P,Q)&=\frac{P\cdot U_{n-1}(P,Q) + V_{n-1}(P,Q)}{2},  \\
V_n(P,Q)&=\frac{(P^2-4Q)\cdot U_{n-1}(P,Q)+P\cdot V_{n-1}(P,Q)}{2}.
\end{align}$$

The above relations can be stated in matrix form as follows:

$$\begin{bmatrix} U_n(P,Q)\\ U_{n+1}(P,Q)\end{bmatrix} = \begin{bmatrix} 0 & 1\\ -Q & P\end{bmatrix}\cdot \begin{bmatrix} U_{n-1}(P,Q)\\ U_n(P,Q)\end{bmatrix},$$

$$\begin{bmatrix} V_n(P,Q)\\ V_{n+1}(P,Q)\end{bmatrix} = \begin{bmatrix} 0 & 1\\ -Q & P\end{bmatrix}\cdot \begin{bmatrix} V_{n-1}(P,Q)\\ V_n(P,Q)\end{bmatrix},$$

$$\begin{bmatrix} U_n(P,Q)\\ V_n(P,Q)\end{bmatrix} = \begin{bmatrix} P/2 & 1/2\\ (P^2-4Q)/2 & P/2\end{bmatrix}\cdot \begin{bmatrix} U_{n-1}(P,Q)\\ V_{n-1}(P,Q)\end{bmatrix}.$$

Initial terms of Lucas sequences $U_n(P,Q)$ and $V_n(P,Q)$ are given in the table:

$$\begin{array}{r|l|l}
n & U_n(P,Q) & V_n(P,Q)
\\
\hline
0 & 0 & 2
\\
1 & 1 & P
\\
2 & P & {P}^{2}-2Q
\\
3 & {P}^{2}-Q & {P}^{3}-3PQ
\\
4 & {P}^{3}-2PQ & {P}^{4}-4{P}^{2}Q+2{Q}^{2}
\\
5 & {P}^{4}-3{P}^{2}Q+{Q}^{2} & {P}^{5}-5{P}^{3}Q+5P{Q}^{2}
\\
6 & {P}^{5}-4{P}^{3}Q+3P{Q}^{2} & {P}^{6}-6{P}^{4}Q+9{P}^{2}{Q}^{2}-2{Q}^{3}
\end{array}$$

== Explicit expressions ==
The characteristic equation of the recurrence relation for Lucas sequences $U_n(P,Q)$ and $V_n(P,Q)$ is:

$$x^2 - Px + Q=0 \,$$

It has the discriminant $D = P^2 - 4Q$ and, by the quadratic formula, has the roots:

$$a = \frac{P+\sqrt{D}}2\quad\text{and}\quad b = \frac{P-\sqrt{D}}2. \,$$

Thus:

$$a + b = P\, ,$$
$$a b = \frac{1}{4}(P^2 - D) = Q\, ,$$
$$a - b = \sqrt{D}\, .$$

Note that the sequence $a^n$ and the sequence $b^n$ also satisfy the recurrence relation. However these might not be integer sequences.

=== Distinct roots ===
When $D\ne 0$, a and b are distinct and one quickly verifies that

$$a^n = \frac{V_n + U_n \sqrt{D}}{2}$$

$$b^n = \frac{V_n - U_n \sqrt{D}}{2}.$$

It follows that the terms of Lucas sequences can be expressed in terms of a and b as follows

$$U_n = \frac{a^n-b^n}{a-b} = \frac{a^n-b^n}{ \sqrt{D}}$$

$$V_n = a^n+b^n \,$$

=== Repeated root ===
The case $D=0$ occurs exactly when $P=2S \text{ and }Q=S^2$ for some integer S so that $a=b=S$. In this case one easily finds that

$$U_n(P,Q)=U_n(2S,S^2) = nS^{n-1}\,$$

$$V_n(P,Q)=V_n(2S,S^2)=2S^n.\,$$

== Properties ==
=== Generating functions ===
The ordinary generating functions are

$$\sum_{n\ge 0} U_n(P,Q)z^n = \frac{z}{1-Pz+Qz^2};$$
$$\sum_{n\ge 0} V_n(P,Q)z^n = \frac{2-Pz}{1-Pz+Qz^2}.$$

=== Pell equations ===
When $Q=\pm 1$, the Lucas sequences $U_n(P, Q)$ and $V_n(P, Q)$ satisfy certain Pell equations:

$$V_n(P,1)^2 - D\cdot U_n(P,1)^2 = 4,$$
$$V_n(P,-1)^2 - D\cdot U_n(P,-1)^2 = 4(-1)^n.$$

=== Relations between sequences with different parameters ===
- For any number c, the sequences $U_n(P', Q')$ and $V_n(P', Q')$ with

$$P' = P + 2c$$
$$Q' = cP + Q + c^2$$

have the same discriminant as $U_n(P, Q)$ and $V_n(P, Q)$:

$$P'^2 - 4Q' = (P+2c)^2 - 4(cP + Q + c^2) = P^2 - 4Q = D.$$

- For any number c, we also have

$$U_n(cP,c^2Q) = c^{n-1}\cdot U_n(P,Q),$$
$$V_n(cP,c^2Q) = c^n\cdot V_n(P,Q).$$

=== Other relations ===
The terms of Lucas sequences satisfy relations that are generalizations of those between Fibonacci numbers $F_n=U_n(1,-1)$ and Lucas numbers $L_n=V_n(1,-1)$. For example:

$$\begin{array}{l|l|r}
\text{General case} & (P,Q) = (1,-1), D = P^2 - 4Q = 5
\\
\hline
D U_n = {V_{n+1} - Q V_{n-1}}=2V_{n+1}-P V_n  & 5F_n = {L_{n+1} + L_{n-1}}=2L_{n+1} - L_{n} & (1)
\\
V_n = U_{n+1} - Q U_{n-1}=2U_{n+1}-PU_n  & L_n = F_{n+1} + F_{n-1}=2F_{n+1}-F_n & (2)
\\
U_{m+n} = U_n U_{m+1} - Q U_m U_{n-1} = U_mV_n-Q^nU_{m-n} & F_{m+n} = F_n F_{m+1} + F_m F_{n-1} =F_mL_n-(-1)^nF_{m-n} & (3)
\\
U_{2n} = U_n (U_{n+1} - QU_{n-1}) = U_n V_n  & F_{2n} = F_n (F_{n+1} + F_{n-1}) = F_n L_n & (4)
\\
U_{2n+1} = U_{n+1}^2 - Q U_n^2 & F_{2n+1} = F_{n+1}^2 + F_n^2 & (5)
\\
V_{m+n} = V_m V_n - Q^n V_{m-n} = D U_m U_n + Q^n V_{m-n} & L_{m+n} = L_m L_n - (-1)^n L_{m-n} = 5 F_m F_n + (-1)^n L_{m-n} & (6)
\\
V_{2n} = V_n^2 - 2Q^n = D U_n^2 + 2Q^n & L_{2n} = L_n^2 - 2(-1)^n = 5 F_n^2 + 2(-1)^n & (7)
\\
U_{m+n} = \frac{U_mV_n+U_nV_m}{2} & F_{m+n} = \frac{F_mL_n+F_nL_m}{2} & (8)
\\
V_{m+n}=\frac{V_mV_n+DU_mU_n}{2} & L_{m+n}=\frac{L_mL_n+5F_mF_n}{2} & (9)
\\
V_n^2-DU_n^2=4Q^n & L_n^2-5F_n^2=4(-1)^n & (10)
\\
U_n^2-U_{n-1}U_{n+1}=Q^{n-1} & F_n^2-F_{n-1}F_{n+1}=(-1)^{n-1} & (11)
\\
V_n^2-V_{n-1}V_{n+1}=DQ^{n-1} & L_n^2-L_{n-1}L_{n+1}=5(-1)^{n-1} & (12)
\\
2^{n-1}U_n={n \choose 1}P^{n-1}+{n \choose 3}P^{n-3}D+\cdots & 2^{n-1}F_n={n \choose 1}+5{n \choose 3}+\cdots & (13)
\\
2^{n-1}V_n=P^n+{n \choose 2}P^{n-2}D+{n \choose 4}P^{n-4}D^2+\cdots & 2^{n-1}L_n=1+5{n \choose 2}+5^2{n \choose 4}+\cdots & (14)
\end{array}$$

==== Fast computation ====
Various analogues of exponentiation by squaring can be used to calculate Lucas sequences efficiently, in $\mathcal{O}(\log n)$ operations. To simultaneously calculate $U_n(P,Q)$ and $V_n(P,Q)$, one can use the properties (3) and (4) to perform double-and-add. Alternatively, calculate the matrix exponentiation $M^n = \big(\begin{smallmatrix} 0 & 1\\ -Q & P\end{smallmatrix}\big)$ to use $\big(\begin{smallmatrix}{U_n}\\{U_{n+1}}\end{smallmatrix}\big) = M^n \big(\begin{smallmatrix}0\\1\end{smallmatrix}\big)$ and $\big(\begin{smallmatrix}{V_n}\\{V_{n+1}}\end{smallmatrix}\big) =M^n \big(\begin{smallmatrix}2\\P\end{smallmatrix}\big).$

(6) and (7) allow fast calculation of V independent of U using double-and-add. The relation $V_{mn} = V_{m}(P = V_n, Q = Q_n)$ (which belongs to the section above, "relations between sequences with different parameters") is also useful for this purpose.

Another $\mathcal{O}(\log n)$ method based on (3) and (6) is the Lucas chain. This method takes fewer operations than double-and-add but requires pre-calculation of chains.

=== Divisibility properties ===
Among the consequences is that $U_{km}(P,Q)$ is a multiple of $U_m(P,Q)$, i.e., the sequence $(U_m(P,Q))_{m\ge1}$ is a divisibility sequence. This implies, in particular, that $U_n(P,Q)$ can be prime only when n is prime. Moreover, if $\gcd(P,Q)=1$, then $(U_m(P,Q))_{m\ge1}$ is a strong divisibility sequence.

Other divisibility properties are as follows:

- If n is an odd multiple of m, then $V_m$ divides $V_n$.
- Let N be an integer relatively prime to 2Q. If the smallest positive integer r for which N divides $U_r$ exists, then the set of n for which N divides $U_n$ is exactly the set of multiples of r.
- If P and Q are even, then $U_n, V_n$ are always even except $U_1$.
- If P is odd and Q is even, then $U_n, V_n$ are always odd for every $n > 0$.
- If P is even and Q is odd, then the parity of $U_n$ is the same as n and $V_n$ is always even.
- If P and Q are odd, then $U_n, V_n$ are even if and only if n is a multiple of 3.
- If p is an odd prime, then $U_p\equiv\left(\tfrac{D}{p}\right), V_p\equiv P\pmod{p}$ (see Legendre symbol).
- If p is an odd prime which divides P and Q, then p divides $U_n$ for every $n>1$.
- If p is an odd prime which divides P but not Q, then p divides $U_n$ if and only if n is even.
- If p is an odd prime which divides Q but not P, then p never divides $U_n$ for any $n > 0$.
- If p is an odd prime which divides D but not PQ, then p divides $U_n$ if and only if p divides n.
- If p is an odd prime which does not divide PQD, then p divides $U_l$, where $l=p-\left(\tfrac{D}{p}\right)$.

The last fact generalizes Fermat's little theorem. These facts are used in the Lucas–Lehmer primality test. Like Fermat's little theorem, the converse of the last fact holds often, but not always; there exist composite numbers n relatively prime to D and dividing $U_l$, where $l=n-\left(\tfrac{D}{n}\right)$. Such composite numbers are called Lucas pseudoprimes.

A prime factor of a term in a Lucas sequence which does not divide any earlier term in the sequence is called primitive. Carmichael's theorem states that all but finitely many of the terms in a Lucas sequence have a primitive prime factor. Indeed, Carmichael (1913) showed that if D is positive and n is not 1, 2 or 6, then $U_n$ has a primitive prime factor. In the case D is negative, a deep result of Bilu, Hanrot, Voutier and Mignotte shows that if n > 30, then $U_n$ has a primitive prime factor and determines all cases $U_n$ has no primitive prime factor.

== Specific names ==
The Lucas sequences for some values of P and Q have specific names:

U_{n}(1, −1) : Fibonacci numbers
V_{n}(1, −1) : Lucas numbers
U_{n}(2, −1) : Pell numbers
V_{n}(2, −1) : Pell–Lucas numbers (companion Pell numbers)
U_{n}(2, 1) : Counting numbers
U_{n}(1, −2) : Jacobsthal numbers
V_{n}(1, −2) : Jacobsthal–Lucas numbers
U_{n}(3, 2) : Mersenne numbers 2^{n} − 1
V_{n}(3, 2) : Numbers of the form 2^{n} + 1, which include the Fermat numbers
U_{n}(6, 1) : The square roots of the square triangular numbers.
U_{n}(x, −1) : Fibonacci polynomials
V_{n}(x, −1) : Lucas polynomials
U_{n}(2x, 1) : Chebyshev polynomials of second kind
V_{n}(2x, 1) : Chebyshev polynomials of first kind multiplied by 2
U_{n}(x + 1, x) : Repunits in base x
V_{n}(x + 1, x) : x^{n} + 1

Some Lucas sequences have entries in the On-Line Encyclopedia of Integer Sequences:

$P\,$	$Q\,$	$U_n(P,Q)\,$	$V_n(P,Q)\,$
−1	3	OEIS: A214733	
1	−1	OEIS: A000045	OEIS: A000032
1	1	OEIS: A128834	OEIS: A087204
1	2	OEIS: A107920	OEIS: A002249
2	−1	OEIS: A000129	OEIS: A002203
2	1	OEIS: A001477	OEIS: A007395
2	2	OEIS: A009545	
2	3	OEIS: A088137	
2	4	OEIS: A088138	
2	5	OEIS: A045873	
3	−5	OEIS: A015523	OEIS: A072263
3	−4	OEIS: A015521	OEIS: A201455
3	−3	OEIS: A030195	OEIS: A172012
3	−2	OEIS: A007482	OEIS: A206776
3	−1	OEIS: A006190	OEIS: A006497
3	1	OEIS: A001906	OEIS: A005248
3	2	OEIS: A000225	OEIS: A000051
3	5	OEIS: A190959	
4	−3	OEIS: A015530	OEIS: A080042
4	−2	OEIS: A090017	
4	−1	OEIS: A001076	OEIS: A014448
4	1	OEIS: A001353	OEIS: A003500
4	2	OEIS: A007070	OEIS: A056236
4	3	OEIS: A003462	OEIS: A034472
4	4	OEIS: A001787	
5	−3	OEIS: A015536	
5	−2	OEIS: A015535	
5	−1	OEIS: A052918	OEIS: A087130
5	1	OEIS: A004254	OEIS: A003501
5	4	OEIS: A002450	OEIS: A052539
6	1	OEIS: A001109	OEIS: A003499

== Applications ==
- Lucas sequences are used in probabilistic Lucas pseudoprime tests, which are part of the commonly used Baillie–PSW primality test.
- Lucas sequences are used in some primality proof methods, including the Lucas–Lehmer and Lucas–Lehmer–Riesel tests and the hybrid N−1/N+1 methods such as those in Brillhart-Lehmer-Selfridge 1975.
- LUC is a public-key cryptosystem based on Lucas sequences that implements the analogs of ElGamal (LUCELG), Diffie–Hellman (LUCDIF), and RSA (LUCRSA). The encryption of the message in LUC is computed as a term of certain Lucas sequence, instead of using modular exponentiation as in RSA or Diffie–Hellman. However, it is argued that many of the supposed security advantages of LUC over cryptosystems based on modular exponentiation are either not present, or not as substantial as claimed.

== Generalizations ==
The sequence $V_n(P,Q) = a^n + b^n$, which is a solution to the recurrence $V_n(P,Q) = P V_{n-1}(P,Q) - Q V_{n-2}(P,Q)$ when $a$ and $b$ are the roots of the corresponding quadratic equation $z^2 - Pz + Q = 0$, generalizes to degree $k \ge 1$. Specifically, for the recurrence relation
$$V_n(P_1, \ldots, P_k) = \sum_{j=1}^k P_j V_{n-j}(P_1, \ldots, P_k)$$
with integers $P_1, \ldots, P_k$ and typically with $P_k \ne 0$, let $a_1, \ldots, a_k$ be the roots of the corresponding polynomial equation
$$z^k - \sum_{j=1}^k P_j z^{k-j} = 0.$$
Then
$$V_n(P_1, \ldots, P_k) = \sum_{j=1}^k a_j^n$$
is a sequence of integers satisfying the recurrence, as is evidenced by its ordinary generating function,
$$G_{P_1, \ldots, P_k}(z) = \sum_{n=0}^\infty V_n(P_1, \ldots, P_k) z^n = \frac{k-\sum_{j=1}^{k-1} (k-j) P_j z^j}{1 - \sum_{j=1}^k P_j z^j}.$$

== Software ==
- SageMath implements $U_n$ and $V_n$ as functions lucas_number1() and lucas_number2(), respectively.

== See also ==
- Lucas pseudoprime
- Frobenius pseudoprime
- Somer–Lucas pseudoprime
