= Lucas pseudoprime =

Probabilistic test for the primality of an integer

Lucas pseudoprimes and Fibonacci pseudoprimes are composite integers that pass certain tests which all primes and very few composite numbers pass: in this case, criteria relative to some Lucas sequence.

== Baillie-Wagstaff-Lucas pseudoprimes ==
Baillie and Wagstaff define Lucas pseudoprimes as follows: Given integers P and Q, where P > 0 and $D=P^2-4Q$, let U_{k}(P, Q) and V_{k}(P, Q) be the corresponding Lucas sequences.

Let n be a positive integer and let $\left(\tfrac{D}{n}\right)$ be the Jacobi symbol. We define

$$\delta(n)=n-\left(\tfrac{D}{n}\right).$$

If n is a prime that does not divide Q, then the following congruence condition holds:

$U_{\delta(n)} \equiv 0 \pmod {n}.$	1

If this congruence does not hold, then n is not prime. If n is composite, then this congruence usually does not hold. These are the key facts that make Lucas sequences useful in primality testing.

The congruence (1) represents one of two congruences defining a Frobenius pseudoprime. Hence, every Frobenius pseudoprime is also a Baillie-Wagstaff-Lucas pseudoprime, but the converse does not always hold.

Some good references are chapter 8 of the book by Bressoud and Wagon (with Mathematica code), pages 142–152 of the book by Crandall and Pomerance, and pages 53–74 of the book by Ribenboim.

== Lucas probable primes and pseudoprimes ==
A Lucas probable prime for a given (P, Q) pair is any positive integer n for which equation (1) above is true (see, page 1398).

A Lucas pseudoprime for a given (P, Q) pair is a positive composite integer n for which equation (1) is true (see, page 1391).

A Lucas probable prime test is most useful if D is chosen such that the Jacobi symbol $\left(\tfrac{D}{n}\right)$ is −1 (see pages 1401–1409 of, page 1024 of, or pages 266–269 of ). This is especially important when combining a Lucas test with a strong pseudoprime test, such as the Baillie–PSW primality test. Typically implementations will use a parameter selection method that ensures this condition (e.g. the Selfridge method recommended in and described below).

If $\left(\tfrac{D}{n}\right)=-1,$ then equation (1) becomes

$U_{n+1} \equiv 0 \pmod {n}.$	2

If congruence (2) is false, this constitutes a proof that n is composite.

If congruence (2) is true, then n is a Lucas probable prime. In this case, either n is prime or it is a Lucas pseudoprime. If congruence (2) is true, then n is likely to be prime (this justifies the term probable prime), but this does not prove that n is prime. As is the case with any other probabilistic primality test, if we perform additional Lucas tests with different D, P and Q, then unless one of the tests proves that n is composite, we gain more confidence that n is prime.

Examples: If P = 3, Q = −1, and D = 13, the sequence of U's is (sequence A006190 in the OEIS): U_{0} = 0, U_{1} = 1, U_{2} = 3, U_{3} = 10, etc.

First, let n = 19. The Jacobi symbol $\left(\tfrac{13}{19}\right)$ is −1, so δ(n) = 20, U_{20} = 6616217487 = 19·348221973 and we have

$$U_{20} = 6616217487 \equiv 0 \pmod {19} .$$

Therefore, 19 is a Lucas probable prime for this (P, Q) pair. In this case 19 is prime, so it is not a Lucas pseudoprime.

For the next example, let n = 119. We have $\left(\tfrac{13}{119}\right)$ = −1, and we can compute

$$U_{120} \equiv 0 \pmod {119}.$$

However, 119 = 7·17 is not prime, so 119 is a Lucas pseudoprime for this (P, Q) pair. In fact, 119 is the smallest pseudoprime for P = 3, Q = −1.

We will see below that, in order to check equation (2) for a given n, we do not need to compute all of the first n + 1 terms in the U sequence.

Let Q = −1, the smallest Lucas pseudoprime to P = 1, 2, 3, ... are

323, 35, 119, 9, 9, 143, 25, 33, 9, 15, 123, 35, 9, 9, 15, 129, 51, 9, 33, 15, 21, 9, 9, 49, 15, 39, 9, 35, 49, 15, 9, 9, 33, 51, 15, 9, 35, 85, 39, 9, 9, 21, 25, 51, 9, 143, 33, 119, 9, 9, 51, 33, 95, 9, 15, 301, 25, 9, 9, 15, 49, 155, 9, 399, 15, 33, 9, 9, 49, 15, 119, 9, ...

== Strong Lucas pseudoprimes ==
Now, factor $\delta(n)=n-\left(\tfrac{D}{n}\right)$ into the form $d\cdot2^s$ where $d$ is odd.

A strong Lucas pseudoprime for a given (P, Q) pair is an odd composite number n with GCD(n, D) = 1, satisfying one of the conditions

$$U_d \equiv 0 \pmod n$$

or

$$V_{d \cdot 2^r} \equiv 0 \pmod n$$

for some 0 ≤ r < s; see page 1396 of. A strong Lucas pseudoprime is also a Lucas pseudoprime (for the same (P, Q) pair), but the converse is not necessarily true. Therefore, the strong test is a more stringent primality test than equation (1).

There are infinitely many strong Lucas pseudoprimes, and therefore, infinitely many Lucas pseudoprimes. Theorem 7 in states: Let $P$ and $Q$ be relatively prime positive integers for which $P^2 - 4Q$ is positive but not a square. Then there is a positive constant $c$ (depending on $P$ and $Q$) such that the number of strong Lucas pseudoprimes not exceeding $x$ is greater than $c \cdot \log x$, for $x$ sufficiently large.

We can set Q = −1, then $U_n$ and $V_n$ are P-Fibonacci sequence and P-Lucas sequence, the pseudoprimes can be called strong Lucas pseudoprime in base P, for example, the least strong Lucas pseudoprime with P = 1, 2, 3, ... are 4181, 169, 119, ...

An extra strong Lucas pseudoprime is a strong Lucas pseudoprime for a set of parameters (P, Q) where Q = 1, satisfying one of the conditions

$$U_d \equiv 0  \text{  and  } V_d \equiv \pm 2 \pmod {n}$$

or

$$V_{d \cdot 2^r} \equiv 0 \pmod {n}$$

for some $0 \le r < s-1$. An extra strong Lucas pseudoprime is also a strong Lucas pseudoprime for the same $(P,Q)$ pair. No number can be a strong Lucas pseudoprime to more than 1/4 of all bases, or an extra strong Lucas pseudoprime to more than 1/8 of all bases.

== Implementing a Lucas probable prime test ==
Before embarking on a probable prime test, one usually verifies that n, the number to be tested for primality, is odd, is not a perfect square, and is not divisible by any small prime less than some convenient limit. Perfect squares are easy to detect using Newton's method for square roots.

We choose a Lucas sequence where the Jacobi symbol $\left(\tfrac{D}{n}\right)=-1$, so that δ(n) = n + 1.

Given n, one technique for choosing D is to use trial and error to find the first D in the sequence 5, −7, 9, −11, ... such that $\left(\tfrac{D}{n}\right)=-1$. Note that $\left(\tfrac{k}{n}\right)\left(\tfrac{-k}{n}\right)=-1$. (If D and n have a prime factor in common, then $\left(\tfrac{D}{n}\right)=0.$). With this sequence of D values, the average number of D values that must be tried before we encounter one whose Jacobi symbol is −1 is about 1.79. Once we have D, we set $P=1$ and $Q=(1-D)/4$. It is a good idea to check that n has no prime factors in common with P or Q. This method ("Method A") of choosing D, P, and Q was suggested by John Selfridge.

(This search will never succeed if n is square, and conversely if it does succeed, that is proof that n is not square. Thus, some time can be saved by delaying testing n for squareness until after the first few search steps have all failed.)

Given D, P, and Q, there are recurrence relations that enable us to quickly compute $U_{n+1}$ and $V_{n+1}$ in $O(\log_2 n)$ steps; see Lucas sequence § Other relations. To start off,

$$U_1=1$$
$$V_1=P$$
$$Q^1=Q$$

First, we can double the subscript from $k$ to $2k$ in one step using the recurrence relations

$$U_{2k}=U_k\cdot V_k,$$
$$V_{2k}=V_k^2-2Q^k=\frac{V_k^2+DU_k^2}{2},$$
$$Q^{2k}=(Q^k)^2.$$

Next, we can increase the subscript by 1 using the recurrences

$$U_{2k+1}=(P\cdot U_{2k}+V_{2k})/2,$$
$$V_{2k+1}=(D\cdot U_{2k}+P\cdot V_{2k})/2,$$
$$Q^{2k+1}=Q\cdot Q^{2k}.$$

At each stage, we reduce all of the variables modulo n. When dividing by 2 modulo n, if the numerator is odd add n (which does not change the value modulo n) to make it even before dividing by 2.'

We use the bits of the binary expansion of n to determine which terms in the sequence to compute. For example, if n+1 = 44 (= 101100 in binary), then, taking the bits one at a time from left to right, we obtain the sequence of indices to compute: 1_{2} = 1, 10_{2} = 2, 100_{2} = 4, 101_{2} = 5, 1010_{2} = 10, 1011_{2} = 11, 10110_{2} = 22, 101100_{2} = 44. Therefore, we compute U_{1}, U_{2}, U_{4}, U_{5}, U_{10}, U_{11}, U_{22}, and U_{44}. We also compute the same-numbered terms in the V sequence, along with Q^{1}, Q^{2}, Q^{4}, Q^{5}, Q^{10}, Q^{11}, Q^{22}, and Q^{44}.

By the end of the calculation, we will have computed U_{n+1}, V_{n+1}, and Q^{n+1}, (mod n). We then check congruence (2) using our expected value of U_{n+1}.

When the parameters D, P, and Q are chosen as described above, the first 10 Lucas pseudoprimes are: 323, 377, 1159, 1829, 3827, 5459, 5777, 9071, 9179, and 10877 (sequence A217120 in the OEIS)

The strong versions of the Lucas test can be implemented in a similar way. With the same parameters, the first 10 strong Lucas pseudoprimes are: 5459, 5777, 10877, 16109, 18971, 22499, 24569, 25199, 40309, and 58519 (sequence A217255 in the OEIS)

Extra strong Lucas pseudoprimes use different parameters: fix $Q = 1$. Then try P = 3, 4, 5, 6, ..., until a value of $D=P^2-4Q$ is found so that the Jacobi symbol $\left(\tfrac{D}{n}\right)=-1$. The first 10 extra strong Lucas pseudoprimes are 989, 3239, 5777, 10877, 27971, 29681, 30739, 31631, 39059, and 72389 (sequence A217719 in the OEIS)

=== Checking additional congruence conditions ===
If we have checked that congruence (2) is true, there are additional congruence conditions we can check that have almost no additional computational cost. By providing an additional opportunity for n to be proved composite, these increase the reliability of the test.

If n is an odd prime and $\left(\tfrac{D}{n}\right)=-1$, then we have the following:

$V_{n+1} \equiv 2 Q \pmod n.$	3

Although this congruence condition is not part of the Lucas probable prime test proper, it is almost free to check this condition because, as noted above, the easiest way to compute U_{n+1} is to compute V_{n+1} as well.

If Selfridge's Method A (above) for choosing parameters is modified so that, if it selects D = 5, it uses the parameters P = Q = 5 rather than P = 1, Q = −1 (avoiding Q ≠ ±1; "Method A*"), then 913 = 11·83 is the only composite less than 10^{8} for which congruence (3) is true (see page 1409 and Table 6 of;). More extensive calculations show that, with this method of choosing D, P, and Q, there are only five odd, composite numbers less than 10^{15} for which congruence (3) is true.

If $Q \neq \pm 1$ (and GCD(n, Q) = 1), then an Euler–Jacobi probable prime test to the base Q can also be implemented at minor computational cost.

The computation of $V_{n+1}$ depends on $V_{(n+1)/2}$ and $Q^{(n+1)/2}$. This is $Q$ times $Q^{(n-1)/2}$, and if n is prime, then by Euler's criterion,

$$Q^{(n-1)/2} \equiv \left(\tfrac{Q}{n}\right) \pmod {n}$$.

(Here, $\left(\tfrac{Q}{n}\right)$ is the Legendre symbol; if n is prime, this is the same as the Jacobi symbol).

Therefore, if n is prime, we must have,

$Q^{(n+1)/2} \equiv Q \cdot Q^{(n-1)/2} \equiv Q \cdot \left(\tfrac{Q}{n}\right) \pmod n.$	4

The Jacobi symbol on the right side is easy to compute, so this congruence is easy to check. If this congruence does not hold, then n cannot be prime. Provided GCD(n, Q) = 1 then testing for congruence (4) is equivalent to augmenting our Lucas test with a "base Q" Solovay–Strassen primality test.

There is one more congruence condition on $U_n$ and $V_n$ which must be true if n is prime and can be checked.

== Comparison with the Miller–Rabin primality test ==
k applications of the Miller–Rabin primality test declare a composite n to be probably prime with a probability at most (1/4)^{k}.

There is a similar probability estimate for the strong Lucas probable prime test.

Aside from two trivial exceptions (see below), the fraction of (P,Q) pairs (modulo n) that declare a composite n to be probably prime is at most (4/15).

Therefore, k applications of the strong Lucas test would declare a composite n to be probably prime with a probability at most (4/15)^{k}.

There are two trivial exceptions. One is n = 9. The other is when n = p(p+2) is the product of two twin primes. Such an n is easy to factor, because in this case, n+1 = (p+1)^{2} is a perfect square. One can quickly detect perfect squares using Newton's method for square roots.

By combining a Lucas pseudoprime test with a Fermat primality test, say, to base 2, one can obtain very powerful probabilistic tests for primality, such as the Baillie–PSW primality test.

== Fibonacci pseudoprimes ==
When P = 1 and Q = −1, the U_{n}(P,Q) sequence represents the Fibonacci numbers.

A Fibonacci pseudoprime is often defined as a composite number n not divisible by 5 for which congruence (1) holds with P = 1 and Q = −1. By this definition, the Fibonacci pseudoprimes form a sequence:

323, 377, 1891, 3827, 4181, 5777, 6601, 6721, 8149, 10877, ... (sequence A081264 in the OEIS).

The references of Anderson and Jacobsen below use this definition.

If n is congruent to 2 or 3 modulo 5, then Bressoud, and Crandall and Pomerance point out that it is rare for a Fibonacci pseudoprime to also be a Fermat pseudoprime base 2. However, when n is congruent to 1 or 4 modulo 5, the opposite is true, with over 12% of Fibonacci pseudoprimes under 10^{11} also being base-2 Fermat pseudoprimes.

If n is prime and GCD(n, Q) = 1, then we also have

$V_n(P,Q) \equiv P \pmod{n}.$	5

This leads to an alternative definition of Fibonacci pseudoprime:

a Fibonacci pseudoprime is a composite number n for which congruence (5) holds with P = 1 and Q = −1.

This definition leads the Fibonacci pseudoprimes form a sequence:

705, 2465, 2737, 3745, 4181, 5777, 6721, 10877, 13201, 15251, ... (sequence A005845 in the OEIS),

which are also referred to as Bruckman-Lucas pseudoprimes. Hoggatt and Bicknell studied properties of these pseudoprimes in 1974. Singmaster computed these pseudoprimes up to 100000. Jacobsen lists all 111443 of these pseudoprimes less than 10^{13}.

It has been shown that there are no even Fibonacci pseudoprimes as defined by equation (5). However, even Fibonacci pseudoprimes do exist (sequence A141137 in the OEIS) under the first definition given by (1).

A strong Fibonacci pseudoprime is a composite number n for which congruence (5) holds for Q = −1 and all P. It follows that an odd composite integer n is a strong Fibonacci pseudoprime if and only if:

1. n is a Carmichael number
2. 2(p + 1) | (n − 1) or 2(p + 1) | (n − p) for every prime p dividing n.

The smallest example of a strong Fibonacci pseudoprime is 443372888629441 = 17·31·41·43·89·97·167·331.

== Pell pseudoprimes ==
A Pell pseudoprime may be defined as a composite number n for which equation (1) above is true with P = 2 and Q = −1; the sequence U_{n} then being the Pell sequence. The first pseudoprimes are then 35, 169, 385, 779, 899, 961, 1121, 1189, 2419, ...

This differs from the definition in OEIS: A099011 which may be written as:

$$\text{  } U_n \equiv \left(\tfrac{2}{n}\right) \pmod {n}$$

with (P, Q) = (2, −1) again defining U_{n} as the Pell sequence. The first pseudoprimes are then 169, 385, 741, 961, 1121, 2001, 3827, 4879, 5719, 6215 ...

A third definition uses equation (5) with (P, Q) = (2, −1), leading to the pseudoprimes 169, 385, 961, 1105, 1121, 3827, 4901, 6265, 6441, 6601, 7107, 7801, 8119, ...
