= Cornacchia (disambiguation) =

Cornacchia is an Italian surname.

Cornacchia may also refer to:

- Cornacchia, a frazione of San Polo d'Enza, Reggio Emilia, Italy
- Monte Cornacchia (disambiguation), two mountains in Italy

== See also ==
- Cornacchia's algorithm, described in 1908 by Giuseppe Cornacchia
- Stadio Adriatico – Giovanni Cornacchia, a stadium in Pescara, Abruzzo, Italy
