= Lucas test =

Lucas test may refer to

- Lucas primality test for primality of general numbers
- Lucas–Lehmer primality test for Mersenne primes
- Lucas' reagent, used to classify alcohols of low molecular weight
