= Robert Rumely =

American mathematician

Robert Scott Rumely (born 1952) is a professor of mathematics at the University of Georgia who specializes in number theory and arithmetic geometry. He is one of the inventors of the Adleman–Pomerance–Rumely primality test.

== Life ==
Rumely was born on June 23, 1952, in Pullman, Washington. He graduated from Grinnell College in 1974, and completed his Ph.D. in 1978 at Princeton University under the supervision of Goro Shimura. After temporary positions at the Massachusetts Institute of Technology and Harvard University, he joined the University of Georgia faculty in 1981.

Rumely has taught a summer Research Experiences for Undergraduates program on the mathematics of paper folding.

== Books ==
He is the author or co-author of four books:

- Capacity Theory on Algebraic Curves (Lecture Notes in Mathematics 1378, 1989)
- Existence of the Sectional Capacity (Memoirs of the American Mathematical Society 145, 2000)
- Potential Theory and Dynamics on the Berkovich Projective Line (Mathematical Surveys and Monographs 159, 2010)
- Capacity Theory with Local Rationality: The Strong Fekete-Szegö Theorem on Curves (Mathematical Surveys and Monographs 193, 2013)

== Awards ==
In 2015 he was elected as a Fellow of the American Mathematical Society "for contributions to arithmetic potential theory, computational number theory, and arithmetic dynamics".
