= Lucas primality test =

Algorithm for checking if a number is prime

In computational number theory, the Lucas test is a primality test for a natural number n; it requires that the prime factors of n − 1 be already known. It is the basis of the Pratt certificate that gives a concise verification that n is prime.

== Concepts ==
Let n be a positive integer. If there exists an integer a, 1 < a < n, such that

$$a^{n-1}\ \equiv\ 1 \pmod n \,$$

and for every prime factor q of n − 1

$$a^{({n-1})/q}\ \not\equiv\ 1 \pmod n \,$$

then n is prime. If no such number a exists, then n is either 1, 2, or composite.

The reason for the correctness of this claim is as follows: if the first equivalence holds for a, we can deduce that a and n are coprime. If a also survives the second step, then the order of a in the group (Z/nZ)* is equal to n − 1, which means that the order of that group is n − 1 (because the order of every element of a group divides the order of the group), implying that n is prime. Conversely, if n is prime, then there exists a primitive root modulo n, or generator of the group (Z/nZ)*. Such a generator has order |(Z/nZ)*| = n − 1 and both equivalences will hold for any such primitive root.

Note that if there exists an a < n such that the first equivalence fails, a is called a Fermat witness for the compositeness of n.

== Example ==
For example, take n = 71. Then n − 1 = 70 and the prime factors of 70 are 2, 5 and 7. We randomly select an a = 17 < n. Now we compute:

$$17^{70}\ \equiv\ 1 \pmod {71}.$$

For all integers a it is known that

$$a^{n - 1}\equiv 1 \pmod{n}\ \text{  if and only if } \text{ ord}(a)\mid(n-1).$$

Therefore, the multiplicative order of 17 (mod 71) is not necessarily 70 because some factor of 70 may also work above. So check 70 divided by its prime factors:

$$17^{35}\ \equiv\ 70\ \not\equiv\ 1 \pmod {71}$$

$$17^{14}\ \equiv\ 25\ \not\equiv\ 1 \pmod {71}$$

$$17^{10}\ \equiv\ 1\ \equiv\ 1 \pmod {71}.$$

Unfortunately, we get that 17^{10} ≡ 1 (mod 71). So we still do not know if 71 is prime or not.

We try another random a, this time choosing a = 11. Now we compute:

$$11^{70}\ \equiv\ 1 \pmod {71}.$$

Again, this does not show that the multiplicative order of 11 (mod 71) is 70 because some factor of 70 may also work. So check 70 divided by its prime factors:

$$11^{35}\ \equiv\ 70\ \not\equiv\ 1 \pmod {71}$$

$$11^{14}\ \equiv\ 54\ \not\equiv\ 1 \pmod {71}$$

$$11^{10}\ \equiv\ 32\ \not\equiv\ 1 \pmod {71}.$$

So the multiplicative order of 11 (mod 71) is 70, and thus 71 is prime.

(To carry out these modular exponentiations, one could use a fast exponentiation algorithm like binary or addition-chain exponentiation).

== Algorithm ==
The algorithm can be written in pseudocode as follows:

algorithm lucas_primality_test is
    input: n > 2, an odd integer to be tested for primality.
           k, a parameter that determines the accuracy of the test.
    output: prime if n is prime, otherwise composite or possibly composite.

    determine the prime factors of n−1.

    LOOP1: repeat k times:
        pick a randomly in the range [2, n − 1]
            if 
  
    
      
        
          a
          
            n
            −
            1
          
        
        ≢
        1
        
          
          (
          mod
          
          n
          )
        
      
    
    {\displaystyle a^{n-1}\not \equiv 1{\pmod {n}}}
  
 then
                return composite
            else # 
  
    
      
        
          
            
              a
              
                n
                −
                1
              
            
            ≡
            1
            
              
              (
              mod
              
              n
              )
            
          
        
      
    
    {\displaystyle \color {Gray}{a^{n-1}\equiv 1{\pmod {n}}}}
  

                LOOP2: for all prime factors q of n−1:
                    if 
  
    
      
        
          a
          
            
              
                n
                −
                1
              
              q
            
          
        
        ≢
        1
        
          
          (
          mod
          
          n
          )
        
      
    
    {\displaystyle a^{\frac {n-1}{q}}\not \equiv 1{\pmod {n}}}
  
 then
                        if we checked this equality for all prime factors of n−1 then
                            return prime
                        else
                            continue LOOP2
                    else # 
  
    
      
        
          
            
              a
              
                
                  
                    n
                    −
                    1
                  
                  q
                
              
            
            ≡
            1
            
              
              (
              mod
              
              n
              )
            
          
        
      
    
    {\displaystyle \color {Gray}{a^{\frac {n-1}{q}}\equiv 1{\pmod {n}}}}
  

                        continue LOOP1

    return possibly composite.

== See also ==
- Édouard Lucas, for whom this test is named
- Fermat's little theorem
- Pocklington primality test, an improved version of this test which only requires a partial factorization of n − 1
- Primality certificate
