= Catalan pseudoprime =

Set of composite numbers

In mathematics, a Catalan pseudoprime is an odd composite number n satisfying the congruence

$$(-1)^{\frac{n-1}{2}} \cdot C_{\frac{n-1}{2}} \equiv 2 \pmod n,$$

where C_{m} denotes the m-th Catalan number.

The above congruence holds for every odd prime number n, so any composite n that satisfies it is pseudoprime.

== Properties ==
The only known Catalan pseudoprimes are: 5907, 1194649, and 12327121 (sequence A163209 in the OEIS) with the latter two being squares of Wieferich primes. In general, if p is a Wieferich prime, then p^{2} is a Catalan pseudoprime.
