= Strong pseudoprime =

Composite number which passes Miller–Rabin primality test

A strong pseudoprime is a composite number that passes the Miller–Rabin primality test. All prime numbers pass this test, but a small fraction of composites also pass, making them "pseudoprimes".

Unlike the Fermat pseudoprimes, for which there exist numbers that are pseudoprimes to all coprime bases (the Carmichael numbers), there are no composites that are strong pseudoprimes to all bases, i.e. there are no "strong Carmichael numbers".

== Motivation and first examples ==
Let us say we want to investigate if n = 31697 is a probable prime (PRP). We pick base a = 3 and, inspired by Fermat's little theorem, calculate:

$$3^{31696} \equiv 1 \pmod {31697}$$

This shows 31697 is a Fermat PRP (base 3), so we may suspect it is a prime. We now repeatedly halve the exponent:

$$3^{15848} \equiv 1 \pmod {31697}$$
$$3^{7924} \equiv 1 \pmod {31697}$$
$$3^{3962} \equiv 28419 \pmod {31697}$$

The first couple of times do not yield anything interesting (the result was still 1 modulo 31697), but at exponent 3962 we see a result that is neither 1 nor −1 (i.e. 31696) modulo 31697, proving 31697 is composite, and therefore not a strong pseudoprime to base 3. Modulo a prime, the residue 1 can have no other square roots than +1 and −1, but if the modulus is composite, 1 can have square root +1 modulo some factors and −1 modulo others, leading to additional possibilities.

In cases like this, where a number is a Fermat pseudoprime but not a strong pseudoprime, this even gives us a factorization: 31697 = gcd(28419+1, 31697) × gcd(28419−1, 31697) = 29 × 1093.

For another example, pick n = 47197 and calculate in the same manner:

$$3^{47196} \equiv 1 \pmod {47197}$$
$$3^{23598} \equiv 1 \pmod {47197}$$
$$3^{11799} \equiv 1 \pmod {47197}$$

In this case, the result continues to be +1 (mod 47197) until we reach an odd exponent. In this situation, we say that 47197 is a strong probable prime to base 3. Because it turns out this PRP is in fact composite (can be seen by picking other bases than 3), we have that 47197 is a strong pseudoprime to base 3.

Finally, consider n = 74593 where we get:

$$3^{74592} \equiv 1 \pmod {74593}$$
$$3^{37296} \equiv 1 \pmod {74593}$$
$$3^{18648} \equiv 74592 \equiv -1 \pmod {74593}$$

Here, we reach minus −1 modulo 74593, a situation that is perfectly possible with a prime. When this occurs, we stop the calculation (even though the exponent is not odd yet) and say that 74593 is a strong probable prime (and, as it turns out, a strong pseudoprime) to base 3.

== Formal definition ==
An odd composite number n = d · 2^{s} + 1 where d is odd is called a strong (Fermat) pseudoprime to base a if:

$$a^d\equiv 1\pmod n$$

or

$$a^{d\cdot 2^r}\equiv -1\pmod n\quad\mbox{ for some }0 \leq r < s .$$

(If a number n satisfies one of the above conditions and we don't yet know whether it is prime, it is more precise to refer to it as a strong probable prime to base a. But if we know that n is not prime, then we may use the term strong pseudoprime.)

The definition is trivially met if a ≡ ±1 (mod n) so these trivial bases are often excluded.

Guy mistakenly gives a definition with only the first condition, which is not satisfied by all primes.

== Properties of strong pseudoprimes ==
A strong pseudoprime to base a is always an Euler–Jacobi pseudoprime, an Euler pseudoprime and a Fermat pseudoprime to that base, but not all Euler–Jacobi, Euler and Fermat pseudoprimes are strong pseudoprimes. Carmichael numbers may be strong pseudoprimes to some bases—for example, 561 is a strong pseudoprime to base 50—but not to all bases.

A composite number n is a strong pseudoprime to at most one quarter of all bases below n; thus, there are no "strong Carmichael numbers", numbers that are strong pseudoprimes to all bases. Thus given a random base, the probability that a number is a strong pseudoprime to that base is less than 1/4, forming the basis of the widely used Miller–Rabin primality test. The true probability of a failure is generally vastly smaller. Paul Erdős and Carl Pomerance showed in 1986 that if a random integer n passes the Miller–Rabin primality test to a random base b, then n is almost surely a prime. For example, of the first odd natural numbers less than 25×10^{9}, there are 1,091,987,405 probable primes to base 2, but only 21,853 of them are pseudoprimes, and only 4,842 of those are strong pseudoprimes.

However, there are infinitely many strong pseudoprimes to any base, and there exist numbers which are strong pseudoprimes to any desired set of bases. Arnault gives a 397-digit Carmichael number that is a strong pseudoprime to every base less than 307.

One way to reduce the chance that such a number is wrongfully declared probably prime is to combine a strong probable prime test with a Lucas probable prime test, as in the Baillie–PSW primality test.

== Examples ==
The first strong pseudoprimes to base 2 are

2047, 3277, 4033, 4681, 8321, 15841, 29341, 42799, 49141, 52633, 65281, 74665, 80581, 85489, 88357, 90751, ... (sequence A001262 in the OEIS).

The first to base 3 are

121, 703, 1891, 3281, 8401, 8911, 10585, 12403, 16531, 18721, 19345, 23521, 31621, 44287, 47197, 55969, 63139, 74593, 79003, 82513, 87913, 88573, 97567, ... (sequence A020229 in the OEIS).

The first to base 5 are

781, 1541, 5461, 5611, 7813, 13021, 14981, 15751, 24211, 25351, 29539, 38081, 40501, 44801, 53971, 79381, ... (sequence A020231 in the OEIS).

For base 4, see (sequence A020230 in the OEIS), and for bases 6 to 100, see (sequence A020232 in the OEIS) to (sequence A020326 in the OEIS). By testing the above conditions to several bases, one gets somewhat more powerful primality tests than by using one base alone. For example, there are only 13 numbers less than 25·10^{9} that are strong pseudoprimes to bases 2, 3, and 5 simultaneously; the smallest such number is 25326001. This means that, if n is less than 25326001 and n is a strong probable prime to bases 2, 3, and 5, then n is prime.

Carrying this further, 3825123056546413051 is the smallest number that is a strong pseudoprime to the 9 bases 2, 3, 5, 7, 11, 13, 17, 19, and 23. So, if n is less than 3825123056546413051 and n is a strong probable prime to these 9 bases, then n is prime.

By judicious choice of bases that are not necessarily prime, even better tests can be constructed. For example, there is no composite $< 2^{64}$ that is a strong pseudoprime to all of the seven bases 2, 325, 9375, 28178, 450775, 9780504, and 1795265022.

== Least strong pseudoprime to base a ==
Least strong pseudoprime to base a (sequence A298756 in the OEIS)
a	SPSP	a	SPSP	a	SPSP	a	SPSP
1	9	33	545	65	33	97	49
2	2047	34	33	66	65	98	9
3	121	35	9	67	33	99	25
4	341	36	35	68	25	100	9
5	781	37	9	69	35	101	25
6	217	38	39	70	69	102	133
7	25	39	133	71	9	103	51
8	9	40	39	72	85	104	15
9	91	41	21	73	9	105	451
10	9	42	451	74	15	106	15
11	133	43	21	75	91	107	9
12	91	44	9	76	15	108	91
13	85	45	481	77	39	109	9
14	15	46	9	78	77	110	111
15	1687	47	65	79	39	111	55
16	15	48	49	80	9	112	65
17	9	49	25	81	91	113	57
18	25	50	49	82	9	114	115
19	9	51	25	83	21	115	57
20	21	52	51	84	85	116	9
21	221	53	9	85	21	117	49
22	21	54	55	86	85	118	9
23	169	55	9	87	247	119	15
24	25	56	55	88	87	120	91
25	217	57	25	89	9	121	15
26	9	58	57	90	91	122	65
27	121	59	15	91	9	123	85
28	9	60	481	92	91	124	25
29	15	61	15	93	25	125	9
30	49	62	9	94	93	126	25
31	15	63	529	95	1891	127	9
32	25	64	9	96	95	128	49

9, being the least odd composite number, is the least number which can be a pseudoprime, and shows up often because it is a strong pseudoprime to any base a ≡ ±1 (mod 9).

== Overpseudoprime ==
A composite c is called an overpseudoprime base b when the multiplicative order of b mod c × the number of cyclotomic coset (the coset {0} is not counted, e.g. for 2 mod 9 there are 2 cosets: {1, 2, 4, 8, 7, 5}, {3, 6}; for 2 mod 15 there are 4 cosets: {1, 2, 4, 8}, {3, 6, 12, 9}, {5, 10}, {7, 14, 13, 11}; and for 2 mod 21 there are 5 cosets: {1, 2, 4, 8, 16, 11}, {3, 6, 12}, {5, 10, 20, 19, 17, 13}, {7, 14}, {9, 18, 15}) of b mod c equals c, in fact, the overpseudoprimes base b are exactly the composite factors of the Zsigmondy numbers Zs(n,b,1) for some n (thus, every composite divisor of an overpseudoprime base b is also an overpseudoprime base b). Overpseudoprimes must be strong pseudoprimes, Euler-Jacobi pseudoprimes, Euler pseudoprimes, and Fermat pseudoprimes to the same base b (thus, there is no composite number which is overpseudoprime to all bases coprime to it). There are infinitely many overpseudoprimes to every base b, since if b is perfect power, then Zs(n,b,1) has algebraic factorization and hence must be composite (only n = 1 and n = 2 can be exceptions) if n is not divisible by p when b is an p-th power with prime p, and if b is not perfect power, then the Zsigmondy number Zs(n,b,1) has Aurifeuillean factorization and hence must be composite (except (b, n) = (2, 4), (2, 12), (2, 20), (3, 6)) if (where $b = s^2 \cdot t$ with square-free $t$) $n\equiv t \pmod{2t}$ when $t\equiv 1 \pmod 4$, or if $n\equiv 2t \pmod{4t}$ when $t\equiv 2, 3 \pmod 4$. Also, if the generalized Artin's conjecture is true, then there exist numbers which are overpseudoprimes to any desired set of bases.

Every prime p divides only finitely many (including zero) overpseudoprimes in base b, since for all bases b ≥ 2 and all n ≥ 1, there are only finitely many (prime or composite) numbers r such that the multiplicative order of b mod r is n (all of these r are divisors of Zs(n,b,1), of course there are only finitely many divisors of Zs(n,b,1)), and for base b ≥ 2 and prime p, p divides an overpseudoprime in base b if and only if p does not divide b and p is odd and p is not equal to the odd part of Zs(n,b,1) for any n, and for base b ≥ 2 and prime p, p does not divide any overpseudoprime in base b if and only if p divides b or p = 2 or p equals to the odd part of b−1 or p is a unique prime to base b but not a Wieferich prime to base b.

The overpseudoprimes base 2 are

2047, 3277, 4033, 8321, 65281, 80581, 85489, 88357, 104653, 130561, 220729, 253241, 256999, 280601, 390937, 458989, 486737, 514447, 580337, 818201, 838861, 877099, 916327, 976873, ... (sequence A141232 in the OEIS)

The overpseudoprimes base 3 are

121, 703, 3281, 8401, 12403, 31621, 44287, 47197, 55969, 74593, 79003, 88573, 97567, 105163, 112141, 211411, 221761, 226801, 228073, 293401, 313447, 320167, 328021, 340033, 359341, 432821, 443713, 453259, 478297, 497503, ... (sequence A141350 in the OEIS)

The overpseudoprimes base 5 are

781, 1541, 5461, 13021, 15751, 25351, 29539, 38081, 40501, 79381, 100651, 121463, 133141, 195313, 216457, 315121, 318551, 319507, 326929, 341531, 353827, 375601, 416641, 432821, 453331, 464881, 498451, ... (sequence A141390 in the OEIS)

The overpseudoprimes base 10 are

9, 91, 4187, 6533, 8149, 10001, 11111, 50851, 79003, 83119, 94139, 102173, 118957, 148417, 158497, 166499, 201917, 226273, 237169, 287809, 341503, 351809, 413339, 455971, 463241, 481601, 491063, 497377, ... (sequence A400102 in the OEIS)
