= Elliptic pseudoprime =

Type of pseudoprime

In number theory, a pseudoprime is called an elliptic pseudoprime for (E, P), where E is an elliptic curve defined over the field of rational numbers with complex multiplication by an order in $\mathbb{Q} \big(\sqrt{- d} \big)$, having equation y^{2} = x^{3} + ax + b with a, b integers, P being a point on E and n a natural number such that the Jacobi symbol (−d | n) = −1, if (n + 1)P ≡ 0 (mod n).

The number of elliptic pseudoprimes less than X is bounded above, for large X, by

$$X / \exp((1/3)\log X \log\log\log X /\log\log X) \ .$$
