= Adleman–Pomerance–Rumely primality test =

Algorithm for determining whether a number is prime

In computational number theory, the Adleman–Pomerance–Rumely primality test is an algorithm for determining whether a number is prime. Unlike other, more efficient algorithms for this purpose, it avoids the use of random numbers, so it is a deterministic primality test. It is named after its discoverers, Leonard Adleman, Carl Pomerance, and Robert Rumely. The test involves arithmetic in cyclotomic fields.

It was later improved by Henri Cohen and Hendrik Willem Lenstra, commonly referred to as APR-CL. It can test primality of an integer n in time:

$$(\log n)^{O(\log\,\log\,\log n)}.$$

== Software implementations ==
- UBASIC provides an implementation under the name APRT-CLE (APR Test CL extended)
- A factoring applet that uses APR-CL on certain conditions (source code included)
- Pari/GP uses APR-CL conditionally in its implementation of isprime().
- mpz_aprcl is an open source implementation using C and GMP.
- Jean Penné's LLR uses APR-CL on certain types of prime tests as a fallback option.
