= Fermat's little theorem =

A prime p divides a^p–a for any integer a

In number theory, Fermat's little theorem states that if p is a prime number, then for any integer a, the number a^{p} − a is an integer multiple of p. In the notation of modular arithmetic, this is expressed as
$$a^p \equiv a \pmod p.$$

For example, if a = 2 and p = 7, then 2^{7} = 128, and 128 − 2 = 126 = 7 × 18 is an integer multiple of 7.

If a is not divisible by p; that is, if a is coprime to p, then Fermat's little theorem is equivalent to the statement that a^{p − 1} − 1 is an integer multiple of p, or in symbols:
$$a^{p-1} \equiv 1 \pmod p.$$

For example, if a = 2 and p = 7, then 2^{6} = 64, and 64 − 1 = 63 = 7 × 9 is a multiple of 7.

Fermat's little theorem is the basis for the Fermat primality test and is one of the fundamental results of elementary number theory. The theorem is named after Pierre de Fermat, who stated it in 1640. It is called the "little theorem" to distinguish it from Fermat's Last Theorem.

== History ==
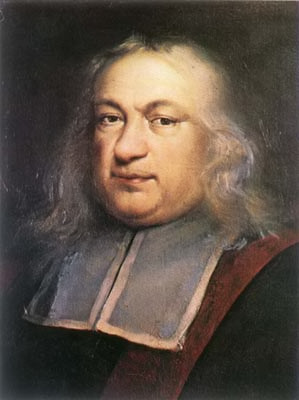
Pierre de Fermat

Pierre de Fermat first stated the theorem in a letter dated October 18, 1640, to his friend and confidant Frénicle de Bessy. His formulation is equivalent to the following:

If p is a prime and a is any integer not divisible by p, then a^{p − 1} − 1 is divisible by p.

Fermat's original statement was

Tout nombre premier mesure infailliblement une des puissances $-1$ de quelque progression que ce soit, et l'exposant de la dite puissance est sous-multiple du nombre premier donné $-1$; et, après qu'on a trouvé la première puissance qui satisfait à la question, toutes celles dont les exposants sont multiples de l'exposant de la première satisfont tout de même à la question.

This may be translated, with explanations and formulas added in brackets for easier understanding, as:

Every prime number [p] divides necessarily one of the powers minus one of any [geometric] progression [a, a^{2}, a^{3}, …] [that is, there exists t such that p divides a^{t} − 1], and the exponent of this power [t] divides the given prime minus one [divides p − 1]. After one has found the first power [t] that satisfies the question, all those whose exponents are multiples of the exponent of the first one satisfy similarly the question [that is, all multiples of the first t have the same property].

Fermat did not consider the case where a is a multiple of p nor prove his assertion, only stating:

Et cette proposition est généralement vraie en toutes progressions et en tous nombres premiers; de quoi je vous envoierois la démonstration, si je n'appréhendois d'être trop long.

(And this proposition is generally true for all series [sic] and for all prime numbers; I would send you a demonstration of it, if I did not fear going on for too long.)

Euler provided the first published proof in 1736, in a paper titled "Theorematum Quorundam ad Numeros Primos Spectantium Demonstratio" (in English: "Demonstration of Certain Theorems Concerning Prime Numbers") in the Proceedings of the St. Petersburg Academy, but Leibniz had given virtually the same proof in an unpublished manuscript from sometime before 1683.

The term "Fermat's little theorem" was probably first used in print in 1913 in Zahlentheorie by Kurt Hensel:

Für jede endliche Gruppe besteht nun ein Fundamentalsatz, welcher der kleine Fermatsche Satz genannt zu werden pflegt, weil ein ganz spezieller Teil desselben zuerst von Fermat bewiesen worden ist.

(There is a fundamental theorem holding in every finite group, usually called Fermat's little theorem because Fermat was the first to have proved a very special part of it.)

An early use in English occurs in A.A. Albert's Modern Higher Algebra (1937), which refers to "the so-called 'little' Fermat theorem" on page 206.

=== Further history ===
Some mathematicians independently made the related hypothesis that 2^{p} ≡ 2 (mod p) if and only if p is prime. Indeed, the "if" part is true, and it is a special case of Fermat's little theorem. However, the "only if" part is false: For example, 2^{341} ≡ 2 (mod 341), but 341 = 11 × 31 is a pseudoprime to base 2. See below.

== Proofs ==
Several proofs of Fermat's little theorem are known. It is frequently proved as a corollary of Euler's theorem.

== Generalizations ==
Euler's theorem is a generalization of Fermat's little theorem: For any modulus n and any integer a coprime to n, one has

$$a^{\varphi (n)} \equiv 1 \pmod n,$$

where φ(n) denotes Euler's totient function (which counts the integers from 1 to n that are coprime to n). Fermat's little theorem is indeed a special case, because if n is a prime number, then φ(n) = n − 1.

A corollary of Euler's theorem is: For every positive integer n, if the integer a is coprime with n, then
$$x \equiv y \pmod{\varphi(n)}\quad\text{implies}\quad a^x \equiv a^y \pmod n,$$
for any integers x and y. This follows from Euler's theorem, since, if $x \equiv y \pmod{\varphi(n)}$, then x = y + kφ(n) for some integer k, and one has
$$a^x = a^{y + \varphi(n)k} = a^y (a^{\varphi(n)})^k \equiv a^y 1^k \equiv a^y \pmod n.$$

If n is prime, this is also a corollary of Fermat's little theorem. This is widely used in modular arithmetic, because this allows reducing modular exponentiation with large exponents to exponents smaller than n.

Euler's theorem is used with n not prime in public-key cryptography, specifically in the RSA cryptosystem, typically in the following way: if
$$y=x^e\pmod n,$$
retrieving x from the values of y, e and n is easy if one knows φ(n). In fact, the extended Euclidean algorithm allows computing the modular inverse of e modulo φ(n), that is, the integer f such that
$$ef\equiv 1\pmod{\varphi(n)}.$$
It follows that
$$x\equiv x^{ef}\equiv (x^e)^f \equiv y^f \pmod n.$$

On the other hand, if n = pq is the product of two distinct prime numbers, then φ(n) = (p − 1)(q − 1). In this case, finding f from n and e is as difficult as computing φ(n) (this has not been proven, but no algorithm is known for computing f without knowing φ(n)). Knowing only n, the computation of φ(n) has essentially the same difficulty as the factorization of n, since φ(n) = (p − 1)(q − 1), and conversely, the factors p and q are the (integer) solutions of the equation x^{2} − (n − φ(n) + 1) x + n = 0.

The basic idea of RSA cryptosystem is thus: If a message x is encrypted as y = x^{e} (mod n), using public values of n and e, then, with the current knowledge, it cannot be decrypted without finding the (secret) factors p and q of n.

Fermat's little theorem is also related to the Carmichael function and Carmichael's theorem, as well as to Lagrange's theorem in group theory.

== Converse ==
The converse of Fermat's little theorem fails for Carmichael numbers. However, a slightly weaker variant of the converse is Lehmer's theorem:

If there exists an integer a such that
$$a^{p-1}\equiv 1\pmod p$$
and for all primes q dividing p − 1 one has
$$a^{(p-1)/q}\not\equiv 1\pmod p,$$
then p is prime.

This theorem forms the basis for the Lucas primality test, an important primality test, and Pratt's primality certificate.

== Pseudoprimes ==
If a and p are coprime numbers such that a^{p−1} − 1 is divisible by p, then p need not be prime. If it is not, then p is called a (Fermat) pseudoprime to base a. The first pseudoprime to base 2 was found in 1820 by Pierre Frédéric Sarrus: 341 = 11 × 31.

A number p that is a Fermat pseudoprime to base a for every number a coprime to p is called a Carmichael number. Alternately, any number p satisfying the equality
$$\gcd\left(p, \sum_{a=1}^{p-1} a^{p-1}\right)=1$$
is either a prime or a Carmichael number.

== Miller–Rabin primality test ==
The Miller–Rabin primality test uses the following extension of Fermat's little theorem:

If p is an odd prime and p − 1 = 2^{s}d with s > 0 and d odd > 0, then for every a coprime to p, either a^{d} ≡ 1 (mod p) or there exists r such that 0 ≤ r < s and a^{2^{r}d} ≡ −1 (mod p).

This result may be deduced from Fermat's little theorem by the fact that, if p is an odd prime, then the integers modulo p form a finite field, in which 1 modulo p has exactly two square roots, 1 and −1 modulo p.

Note that a^{d} ≡ 1 (mod p) holds trivially for a ≡ 1 (mod p), because the congruence relation is compatible with exponentiation. And a^{d} = a^{2^{0}d} ≡ −1 (mod p) holds trivially for a ≡ −1 (mod p) since d is odd, for the same reason. That is why one usually chooses a random a in the interval 1 < a < p − 1.

The Miller–Rabin test uses this property in the following way: given an odd integer p for which primality has to be tested, write p − 1 = 2^{s}d with s > 0 and d odd > 0, and choose a random a such that 1 < a < p − 1; then compute b = a^{d} mod p; if b is not 1 nor −1, then square it repeatedly modulo p until you get −1 or have squared s − 1 times. If b ≠ 1 and −1 has not been obtained by squaring, then p is a composite and a is a witness for the compositeness of p. Otherwise, p is a strong probable prime to base a; that is, it may be prime or not. If p is composite, the probability that the test declares it a strong probable prime anyway is at most 1/4, in which case p is a strong pseudoprime, and a is a strong liar. Therefore after k non-conclusive random tests, the probability that p is composite is at most 4^{−k}, and may thus be made as low as desired by increasing k.

In summary, the test either proves that a number is composite or asserts that it is prime with a probability of error that may be chosen as low as desired. The test is very simple to implement and computationally more efficient than all known deterministic tests. Therefore, it is generally used before starting a proof of primality.

== See also ==
- Fermat quotient
- Frobenius endomorphism
- p-derivation
- Fractions with prime denominators: numbers with behavior relating to Fermat's little theorem
- RSA
- Table of congruences
- Modular multiplicative inverse
