= Mathematical Surveys and Monographs =

Series of monographs published by the American Mathematical Society

Mathematical Surveys and Monographs is a series of monographs published by the American Mathematical Society.

Each volume in the series gives a survey of the subject along with a brief introduction to recent developments and unsolved problems.

The series has been known as Mathematical Surveys and Monographs since 1984. Its ISSN is 0885–4653. The series was founded in 1943 as 'Mathematical Surveys'.
