= Monte Cornacchia =

Monte Cornacchia may refer to the following mountains in Italy:

- Monte Cornacchia (Abruzzi Apennines), mountain of the Abruzzi Apennines
- Monte Cornacchia (Daunian Mountains), the highest peak in the Daunian Mountains

== See also ==
- Monte Cornaccia, mountain of the Ortler Alps
