= Cornacchia's algorithm =

Number-theoretic algorithm

In computational number theory, Cornacchia's algorithm is an algorithm for solving the Diophantine equation $x^2+dy^2=m$, where $1\le d<m$ and d and m are coprime. The algorithm was described in 1908 by Giuseppe Cornacchia.

== The algorithm ==
First, one finds any solution to $r_0^2\equiv-d\pmod m$; if no such $r_0$ exist, there can be no primitive solution to the original equation. Without loss of generality, one can assume that r_{0} ≤ m/2 (if not, then replace r_{0} with m - r_{0}, which will still be a root of -d). Then the Euclidean algorithm can be employed to find $r_1\equiv m\pmod{r_0}$, $r_2\equiv r_0\pmod{r_1}$ and so on; stopping when $r_k<\sqrt m$. If $s=\sqrt{\tfrac{m-r_k^2}d}$ is an integer, then the solution is $x=r_k,y=s$; otherwise try another root of -d until either a solution is found or all roots have been exhausted. In this case there is no primitive solution.

This algorithm can also be used to find non-primitive solutions (x, y) where gcd(x, y) = g ≠ 1, because the existence of such a solution implies that g^{2} divides m (and equivalently, that if m is square-free, then all solutions are primitive). Thus the above algorithm can be used to search for a primitive solution (u, v) to u^{2} + dv^{2} = m/g^{2}. If such a solution is found, then (gu, gv) will be a solution to the original equation.

== Example ==
Solve the equation $x^2+6y^2=103$. A square root of −6 (mod 103) is 32, and 103 ≡ 7 (mod 32); since $7^2<103$ and $\sqrt{\tfrac{103-7^2}6}=3$, there is a solution x = 7, y = 3.
