= Carl Pomerance =

American mathematician (born 1944)

Carl Bernard Pomerance (born 1944) is an American number theorist. He attended college at Brown University and later received his Ph.D. from Harvard University in 1972 with a dissertation proving that any odd perfect number has at least seven distinct prime factors. He joined the faculty at the University of Georgia, becoming full professor in 1982. He subsequently worked at Lucent Technologies for a number of years, and then became a distinguished professor at Dartmouth College.

== Contributions ==
He has over 120 publications, including co-authorship with Richard Crandall of Prime numbers: a computational perspective (Springer-Verlag, first edition 2001, second edition 2005), and with Paul Erdős. He is the inventor of one of the integer factorization methods, the quadratic sieve algorithm, which was used in 1994 for the factorization of RSA-129. He is also one of the discoverers of the Adleman–Pomerance–Rumely primality test.

== Awards and honors ==
He has won many teaching and research awards, including the Chauvenet Prize in 1985, the Deborah and Franklin Haimo Award for Distinguished College or University Teaching of Mathematics in 1997, and the Levi L. Conant Prize in 2001 for "A Tale of Two Sieves".

In 2012 he became a fellow of the American Mathematical Society. He also became the John G. Kemeny Parents Professor of Mathematics in the same year.

== See also ==
- Carmichael numbers
- Ruth–Aaron pair
