= International Conference on Fibonacci Numbers and their Applications =

Mathematics conference

The International Conference on Fibonacci Numbers and their Applications (ICFNTA) is a five-day biennial conference of the Fibonacci Association. Typically, 50 to 100 mathematicians from around the world participate in the event, which takes place at an American university every four years, and alternately at a university outside the United States; see the History section below. Most participants are academics whose research is in number theory or combinatorics. Central to the Fibonacci Association and the ICFNTA conferences is The Fibonacci Quarterly.

== Program ==
The primary component of the ICFNTA is a series of 20-minute research presentations, most of which are subsequently published in conference Proceedings. Several events are, on one of the days of the conference, open to the public. These include an hour-long lecture by an invited speaker. Other activities include an opening session, social events, city tours, excursions to area attractions, a problem session, a formal banquet, and a closing session.

== History ==
In 1963, Verner Emil Hoggatt Jr. and Brother Alfred Brousseau, along with Ivan Dale Ruggles, founded the Fibonacci Association, which, also in 1963, began publishing The Fibonacci Quarterly, a journal that specializes in the Fibonacci sequence and its connections to many mathematical and scientific subjects.

The first ICFNTA took place in 1984 in Patras, Greece, under the leadership of Andreas Philippou, who was Chairman of the Local and International Committees of the Conference and Vice Rector of the University of Patras. Among the organizers were Gerald E. Bergum, editor of the Fibonacci Quarterly and co-chairman of the International Committee; Marjorie Bicknell-Johnson, Secretary of the Fibonacci Association, and Alwyn Francis Horadam. Herta Freitag and Karel de Bouvère both participated in the Conference, and each wrote a report. Subsequent ICFNTA conferences are described below. Formal group pictures from most of these conferences have been collected and made available online: Fibonacci Number-Theorists.

=== 21st ICFNTA ===
The 21st ICFNTA took place at Harvey Mudd College, Claremont, California, July 8–12, 2024. This conference marked a turning point in the history of the Fibonacci Association, as the publisher of The Fibonacci Quarterly would become, beginning in 2025, Taylor & Francis. The Lucas Memorial Lecture was given by Jennifer Quinn, "Lessons that Really Count: The Fibonacci Edition".

=== 20th ICFNTA ===
The 20th ICFNTA was held at the University of Sarajevo, July 25–29, 2022. The 403-page Proceedings show the conference logo, names of editors, a conference report, and a list of speakers and talks, followed by full texts, with abstracts, of 25 papers. Florian Luca gave the plenary talk on "p-adic orders of Tribonacci numbers."

=== 19th ICFNTA ===
Initially planned for the University of Sarajevo, the 19th ICFNTA was instead conducted online, July 21–23, during the covid pandemic. The 236-page Proceedings gives full texts with abstracts for 23 papers. The plenary speakers were Florian Luca and Katherine Stange.

=== 18th ICFNTA ===
The 18th ICFNTA took place at Dalhousie University, Halifax, Nova Scotia, Canada, July 1–7, 2018. The Proceedings, consisting of 183 pages, including 14 papers and 12 problems, were published for open access in The Fibonacci Quarterly. Hugh C. Williams from the University of Calgary presented the Édouard Lucas Memorial Lecture, "Mersenne, Fibonacci and Lucas: The Mersenne Prime Story and Beyond."

=== 17th ICFNTA ===
The venue for the 17th ICFNTA was Université de Caen-Normandie, Caen, France, June 26 to July 2, 2016; Proceedings. The Édouard Lucas Memorial Talk, given by Jean-Paul Allouche, was entitled "Variations on the Binary Fibonacci Sequence." Three special presentations open to the public were given by Andreas Hinz, Ron Knott, and Arthur Benjamin, and there were two one-hour problem sessions.

=== 16th ICFNTA ===
The 16th ICFNTA was held at Rochester Institute of Technology, Rochester, New York, July 20–27, 2014. The Proceedings of 221 pages includes 21 papers and a chapter consisting of 14 problems. The Édouard Lucas Memorial lecture was given by Jeffrey Lagarias.

=== 15th ICFNTA ===
The 15th ICFNTA took place at the Institute of Mathematics and Informatics Eszerházy Károly College, Eger, Hungary, June 25–30, 2012. The Proceedings has 274 pages, covering 21 research papers and a chapter consisting of 14 problems. Neil Sloane, founder of the Online Encyclopedia of Integer Sequences, gave the Édouard Lucas Memorial Lecture titled "The On-Line Encyclopedia of Integer Sequences".

=== 14th ICFNTA ===
The 14th ICFNTA convened at Instituto de Matemáticas de la UNAM in Morelia, Michoacan, Mexico, July 5–9, 2010. The Proceedings has 283 pages, including 22 papers and a chapter of 7 problems. The Édouard Lucas Memorial Lecture on "Combinatorial Trigonometry (and a method to DIE for)" was given by Art Benjamin.

=== 13th ICFNTA ===
The 13th ICFNTA met at the University of Patras in Patras, Greece, July 7–11, 2008. (The 1st ICFNTA also met in Patras.) The Proceedings, initially published as volume 201 of Congressus Numerantium in 2010, are available online: Combinatorial Press. The Proceedings consist of 384 pages, 28 papers, and 12 problem proposals. The Édouard Lucas Memorial Lecturer, Carl Pomerance, spoke on "Primality testing - variations on a theme of Lucas."

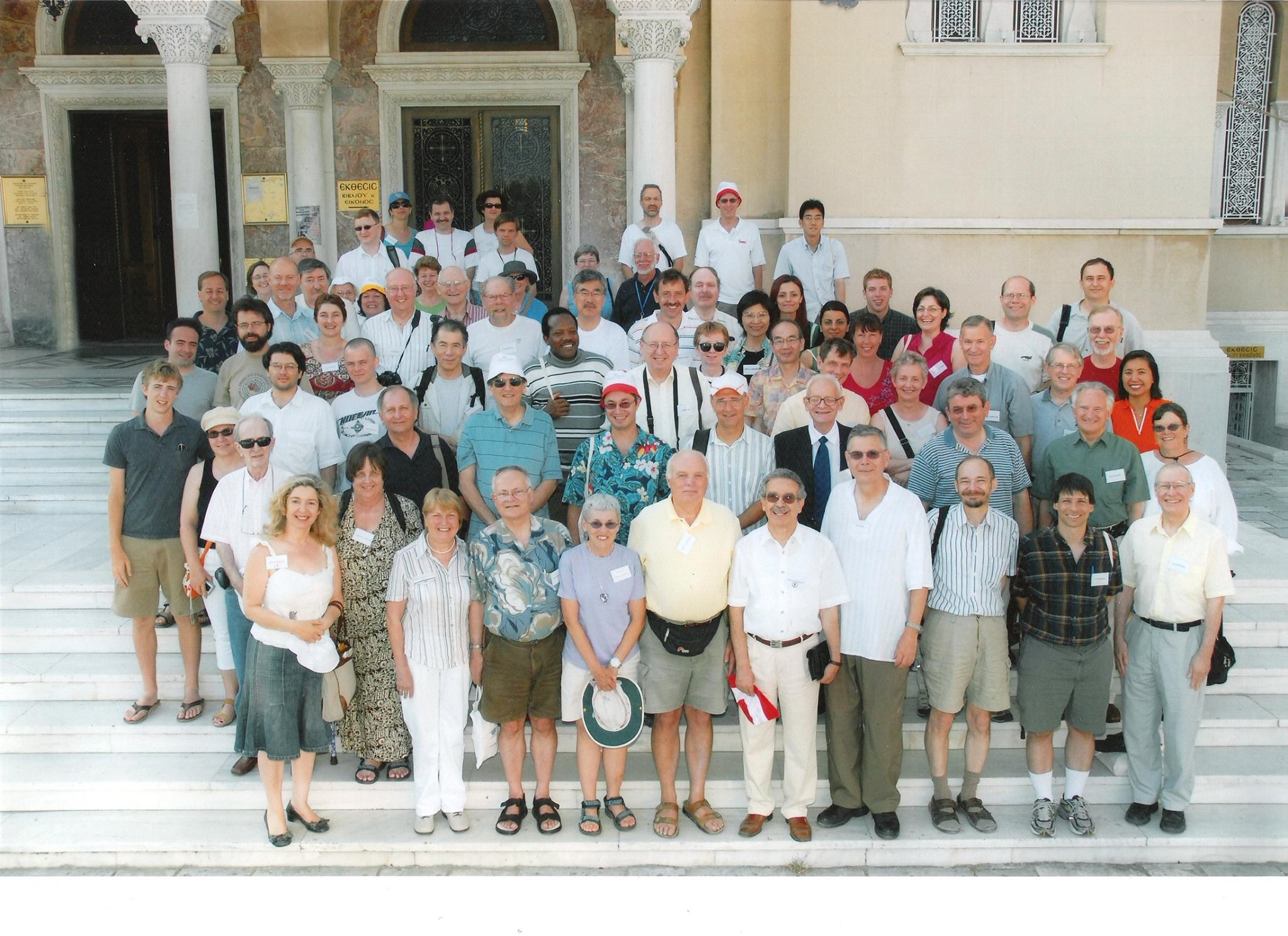
Group photograph, on the steps of the Cathedral of Saint Andrew, Patras

=== 12th ICFNTA ===
The 12th ICFNTA took place at San Francisco State University, San Francisco, California, July 17–21, 2006. The Proceedings, initially published as volume 200 of Congressus Numerantium in 2010, are available online: Combinatorial Press.

=== 11th ICFNTA ===
The 11th ICFNTA was held at Technical University Carolo-Wilhelmina, Braunschweig, Germany, July 5–9, 2004. The Proceedings, initially published as volume 194 of Congressus Numerantium in 2009, are available online: Combinatorial Press.

=== 10th ICFNTA ===
The 10th ICFNTA met at Northern Arizona University, June 24–28, 2002. The Proceedings., edited by Frederic T. Howard, were published in 2004 by Springer Netherlands. The 311 pages include 28 papers and a subject index. A copy is available online: 10th ICFNTA Proceedings.

=== 9th ICFNTA ===
The 9th ICFNTA took place in Luxembourg City, Luxembourg, August 13–16, 1986; although no Proceedings were published, there is a collection of Photographic Memories.

=== 8th ICFNTA ===
The 8th ICFNTA took place at the Rochester Institute of Technology, Rochester, New York, June 22–26, 1998. The Proceedings include pages i-xxiii and 1–384, with a total of 33 papers. There is a collection of Photographic Memories.

=== 7th ICFNTA ===
The 7th ICFNTA convened at the University of Graz in Graz, Austria, July 15–19, 1996. The Proceedings, including pages i-xxxvi and 1–484, with a total of 50 papers from the 95 presented, were published in 1998. They are available online: Springer Nature Link.

=== 6th ICFNTA ===
The 6th ICFNTA was held at Washington State University, Spokane, Washington, July 18–22, 1994. The Proceedings, including pages i-xxviii and 1–551, with a total of 43 papers from the 55 presented, were published in 1996. They are available online: Springer Nature Link.

=== 5th ICFNTA ===
The 5th ICFNTA met at the University of St. Andrews in Fife, Scotland, July 20–24, 1992. The Proceedings, including pages i-xxxiv and 1–625, with a total of 58 papers from the 68 presented, were published in 1993. They are available online: Springer Nature Link.

=== 4th ICFNTA ===
The 4th ICFNTA took place at Wake Forest University in Winston-Salem, North Carolina, July 30 to August 3, 1990. The Proceedings, including pages i-xxiv and 1–313, with a total of 33 papers from the 38 presented, were published in 1991. They are available online: Springer Nature Link.

=== 3rd ICFNTA ===
The 3rd ICFNTA met at the University of Pisa in Pisa, Italy, July 25–29, 1988. The Proceedings, including pages i-xxiv and 1–357, with a total of 36 papers from the 45 presented, were published in 1990. They are available online: Springer Nature Link.

=== 2nd ICFNTA ===
The 2nd ICFNTA was held at San José State University in San José, California, August 13–16, 1986. The Proceedings, including pages 1-xx and 1–213, with a total of 19 papers from the 25 presented, were published in 1988. They are available online: Springer Nature Link.

=== 1st ICFNTA ===
The 1st ICFNTA was held at the University of Patras in Patras, Greece, August 27–31, 1984. The Proceedings, including pages i-xxiv and 1–304, with a total of 21 papers from the 31 presented, were published in 1986 as Mathematics and Its Applications, 28, by D. Reidel Publishing Company of Dordrecht, Holland.

Herta Freitag, member of the Fibonacci Association and Fellow of the American Association for the Advancement of Science, wrote these words about the 1st ICNTA:

To hold this first Conference in Greece, cradle of mathematical thought in antiquity, contributed immeasurably. "The Glory that is Greece" — Greece, the country which is indelibly imbedded in the minds, the hearts, and the souls of all educated persons throughout the world! I believe I speak for all Fibonacci friends across the oceans if I express the hope that this, our First International Conference on Fibonacci Numbers and Their Applications, was but a prelude for those to come.

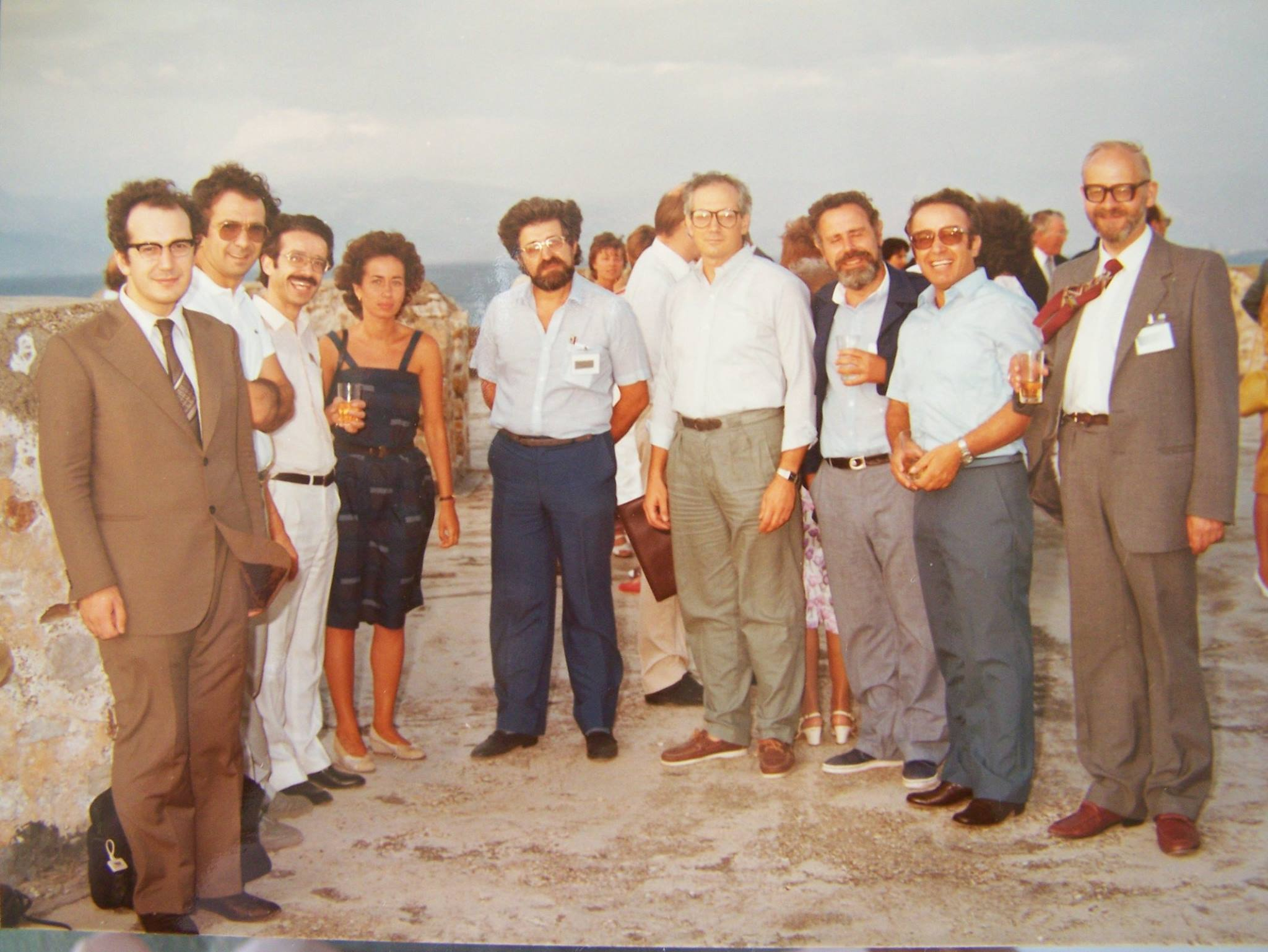
1st IFCNTA, social event at Rio Castle

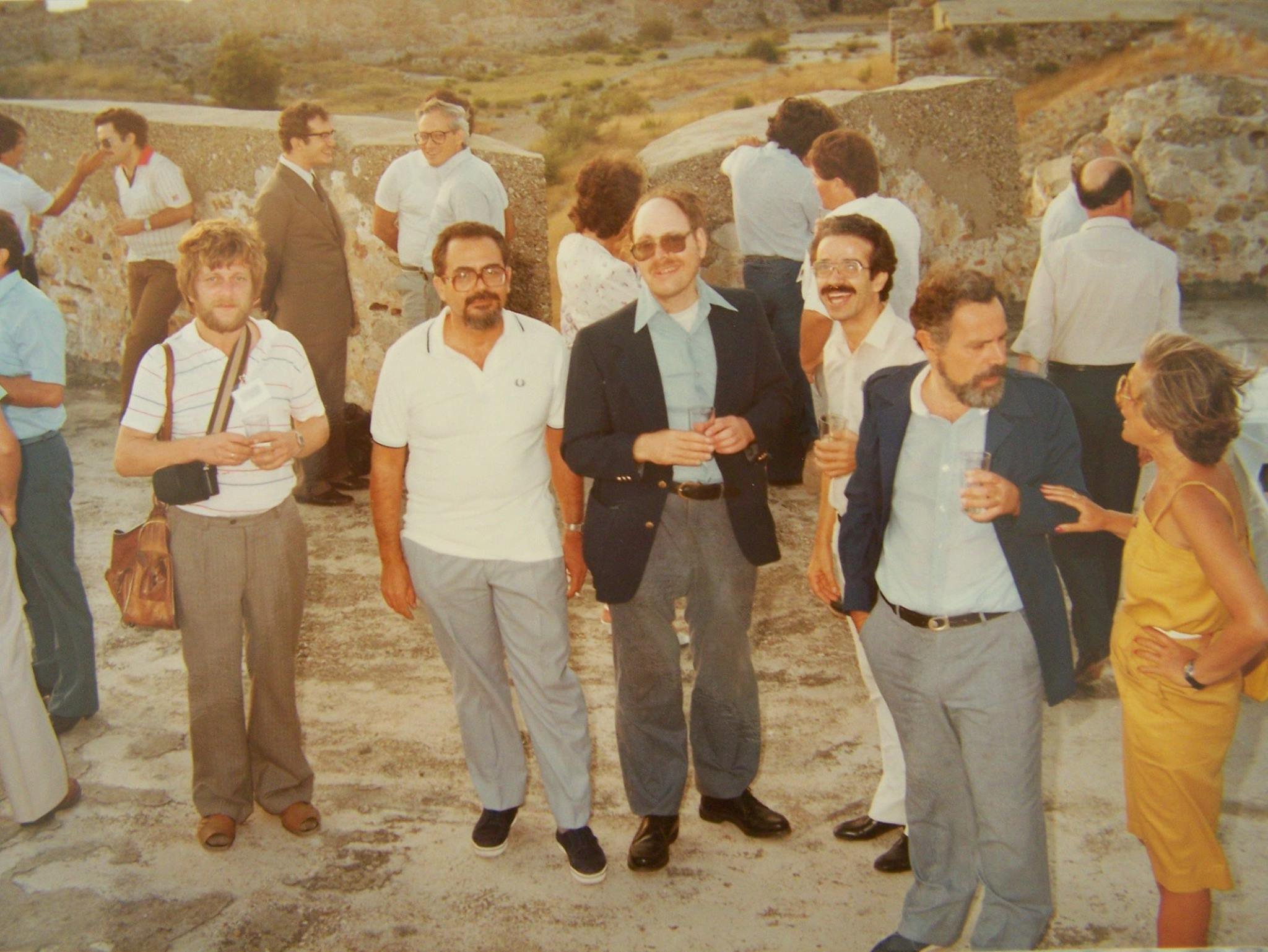
1st IFCNTA, social event at Rio Castle

== The Proceedings ==
The title of the Proceedings of the 1st ICFNTA is Fibonacci Numbers and Their Applications, but title for the 2nd through 8th and 10th Proceedings is slightly different: Applications of Fibonacci Numbers. These nine books are hard-cover publications by Kluwer Academic Publishers, formerly headquartered in Dordrecht, The Netherlands. Kluwer Academic Publishers was merged with Springer Science and Business media in 2004. The Proceedings for conferences 1-7 were all edited by G. E. Bergum, A. N. Philippou, and A. F. Horadam, and for conferences 8 and 10, by Frederic T. Howard, president of the Fibonacci Association, 2000–2005. Of all the ICFNTA conferences, there is only one for which Proceedings were not published, and that was the 9th, hence the fact that Kluwer's volume 9 is for the 10th conference. There does exist, however, a one-page report on the 9th conference, written by George M. Phillips.

The Proceedings for conferences 11, 12, and 13 were published as volumes of Congressus Numerantium. The 11th and 12th conference Proceedings were edited by William Webb, president of the Fibonacci Association, 2006–2018. The editors for the 13th were Florian Luca and Pante Stanica.

The Proceedings for the 14th conference were edited by Florian Luca and Pante Stanica, and published in Aportaciones Matemáticas, Invertigación 20, Sociedad Matemática Mexicana, 2011.

The Proceedings for the 15th conference were edited by Kálmán Liptai, Ferenc Mátyás, and Tibor Juhász, and published in Annales Mathematicae et Informaticae, vol. 41, Institute of Mathematics and Informatics, Eszerházy Károly College, Eger, Hungary.

Links to the Proceedings for conferences 16-20 are printed as a fifth issue in volumes of The Fibonacci Quarterly:

ICFNTA Proceedings in The Fibonacci Quarterly
Vol.	Year	Conference	Editors
60	2022	20th (2022)	Steven J. Miller, Lejla Smajlović; Thomas Martinez, Zenan Šabanac, and Lamija Šceta
58	2020	19th (2020)	Steven J. Miller, Lejla Smajlović; Thomas Martinez, Zenan Šabanac, and Lamija Šceta
57	2019	18th (2018)	Karl Dilcher
55	2017	17th (2016)	Christian Ballot, Peter G. Anderson, Takao Komatsu
52	2014	16th (2014)	Peter G. Anderson, Christian Ballot, William Webb

== Édouard Lucas Memorial Lecture ==
The first Édouard Lucas Memorial Lecture was given at the 13th ICFNTA. The Lecture is named in honor of Édouard Lucas, for whom the Lucas sequence is named.
