= Charity Engine =

BOINC Account Manager for volunteer computing projects

- Company type: Ltd.
- Industry: Volunteer computing
- Founder: Mark McAndrew
- Headquarters: Manchester, United Kingdom
- Key people: Mark McAndrew, Matt Blumberg, Mark Roberts, Stephen Wolfram (advisor)
- Products: Charity Engine PC app
- Owner: The Worldwide Computer Company Limited
- Website: https://www.charityengine.com/

Charity Engine is a free PC app based on Berkeley University's BOINC software, run by The Worldwide Computer Company Limited. The project works by selling spare home computing power to universities and corporations, then sharing the profits between eight partner charities and periodic cash prize draws for the users; those running the Charity Engine BOINC software on their home computers. When there are no corporations purchasing the computing power, Charity Engine donates it to existing volunteer computing projects such as Rosetta@home, Einstein@Home, and Malaria Control, and prize draws are funded by donations.

The company was founded by former journalist Mark McAndrew, who was writing a science fiction novel featuring a similar organisation. He abandoned the book in favour of creating the idea in real life, with the assistance of professor David Anderson from UC Berkeley who created BOINC. The company was incorporated in 2008, but did not start trading until 2011.

The company received €70,000 of EU innovation funding through the Framework Programme 7 (FP7).

== Protein folding ==
In August 2014 the Rosetta@home project reported Charity Engine had contributed over 125,000 new PCs to its grid.

In January 2017, Charity Engine was credited as a significant contributor to solving protein-folding problems in the paper "Protein structure determination using metagenome sequence data" published by the journal Science.

== Sums of three cubes problem ==
In September 2019 a team led by Andrew Booker at the University of Bristol and Andrew Sutherland at Massachusetts Institute of Technology (MIT) used Charity Engine to solve the sums of three cubes problem for the number 42, as well as finding solutions for four other numbers in the same problem. The numbers found by Charity Engine are:

$$3=569\ 936\ 821\ 221\ 962\ 380\ 720^3 + (-569\ 936\ 821\ 113\ 563\ 493\ 509)^3 + (-472\ 715\ 493\ 453\ 327\ 032)^3,$$
$$42=(-80\ 538\ 738\ 812\ 075\ 974)^3 + 80\ 435\ 758\ 145\ 817\ 515^3 + 12\ 602\ 123\ 297\ 335\ 631^3,$$
$$165=(-385\ 495\ 523\ 231\ 271\ 884)^3 + 383\ 344\ 975\ 542\ 639\ 445^3 + 98\ 422\ 560\ 467\ 622\ 814^3,$$
$$579=143\ 075\ 750\ 505\ 019\ 222\ 645^3 + (-143\ 070\ 303\ 858\ 622\ 169\ 975)^3 + (-6\ 941\ 531\ 883\ 806\ 363\ 291)^3,$$
$906=(-74\ 924\ 259\ 395\ 610\ 397)^3 + 72\ 054\ 089\ 679\ 353\ 378^3 + 35\ 961\ 979\ 615\ 356\ 503^3.$
