= Andrew Booker =

Andrew Booker may refer to:

- Andrew Booker (mathematician) (born 1976), British mathematician specializing in number theory
- Andrew Booker (musician), British drummer and vocalist
