= Wagstaff prime =

Prime number of the form (2ᵖ+1)/3

- Named after: Samuel S. Wagstaff, Jr.
- Publication year: 1989
- Author of publication: Bateman, P. T., Selfridge, J. L., Wagstaff Jr., S. S.
- No. of known terms: 44
- First terms: 3, 11, 43, 683
- Largest known term: (2^{138937}+1)/3
- OEIS index: A000979; Wagstaff primes: primes of form (2^p + 1)/3

In number theory, a Wagstaff prime is a prime number of the form

$${{2^p+1}\over 3}$$

where p is an odd prime. Wagstaff primes are named after the mathematician Samuel S. Wagstaff Jr.; the prime pages credit François Morain for naming them in a lecture at the Eurocrypt 1990 conference. Wagstaff primes appear in the New Mersenne conjecture and have applications in cryptography.

== Examples ==
The first three Wagstaff primes are 3, 11, and 43 because

$$\begin{align}
3 & = {2^3+1 \over 3}, \\[5pt]
11 & = {2^5+1 \over 3}, \\[5pt]
43 & = {2^7+1 \over 3}.
\end{align}$$

== Known Wagstaff primes ==
The first few Wagstaff primes are:

3, 11, 43, 683, 2731, 43691, 174763, 2796203, 715827883, 2932031007403, 768614336404564651, ... (sequence A000979 in the OEIS)

Exponents which produce Wagstaff primes or probable primes are:

3, 5, 7, 11, 13, 17, 19, 23, 31, 43, 61, 79, 101, 127, 167, 191, 199, 313, 347, 701, 1709, 2617, 3539, 5807, ... (sequence A000978 in the OEIS)

== Generalizations ==
It is natural to consider more generally numbers of the form

$$Q(b,n)=\frac{b^n+1}{b+1}$$

where the base $b \ge 2$. Since for $n$ odd we have

$$\frac{b^n+1}{b+1}=\frac{(-b)^n-1}{(-b)-1}=R_n(-b)$$

these numbers are called "Wagstaff numbers base $b$", and sometimes considered a case of the repunit numbers with negative base $-b$.

For some specific values of $b$, all $Q(b,n)$ (with a possible exception for very small $n$) are composite because of an "algebraic" factorization. Specifically, if $b$ has the form of a perfect power with odd exponent (like 8, 27, 32, 64, 125, 128, 216, 243, 343, 512, 729, 1000, etc. (sequence A070265 in the OEIS)), then the fact that $x^m+1$, with $m$ odd, is divisible by $x+1$ shows that $Q(a^m, n)$ is divisible by $a^n+1$ in these special cases. Another case is $b=4k^4$, with k a positive integer (like 4, 64, 324, 1024, 2500, 5184, etc. (sequence A141046 in the OEIS)), where we have the aurifeuillean factorization.

However, when $b$ does not admit an algebraic factorization, it is conjectured that an infinite number of $n$ values make $Q(b,n)$ prime, notice all $n$ are odd primes.

For $b=10$, the primes themselves have the following appearance: 9091, 909091, 909090909090909091, 909090909090909090909090909091, … (sequence A097209 in the OEIS), and these ns are: 5, 7, 19, 31, 53, 67, 293, 641, 2137, 3011, 268207, ... (sequence A001562 in the OEIS).

See Repunit § Repunit primes for the list of the generalized Wagstaff primes base $b$. (Generalized Wagstaff primes base $b$ are generalized repunit primes base $-b$ with odd $n$)

The least primes p such that $Q(n, p)$ is prime are (starts with n = 2, 0 if no such p exists)

3, 3, 3, 5, 3, 3, 0, 3, 5, 5, 5, 3, 7, 3, 3, 7, 3, 17, 5, 3, 3, 11, 7, 3, 11, 0, 3, 7, 139, 109, 0, 5, 3, 11, 31, 5, 5, 3, 53, 17, 3, 5, 7, 103, 7, 5, 5, 7, 1153, 3, 7, 21943, 7, 3, 37, 53, 3, 17, 3, 7, 11, 3, 0, 19, 7, 3, 757, 11, 3, 5, 3, ... (sequence A084742 in the OEIS)

The least bases b such that $Q(b, prime(n))$ is prime are (starts with n = 2)

2, 2, 2, 2, 2, 2, 2, 2, 7, 2, 16, 61, 2, 6, 10, 6, 2, 5, 46, 18, 2, 49, 16, 70, 2, 5, 6, 12, 92, 2, 48, 89, 30, 16, 147, 19, 19, 2, 16, 11, 289, 2, 12, 52, 2, 66, 9, 22, 5, 489, 69, 137, 16, 36, 96, 76, 117, 26, 3, ... (sequence A103795 in the OEIS)
