= Richard K. Guy =

British mathematician (1916–2020)

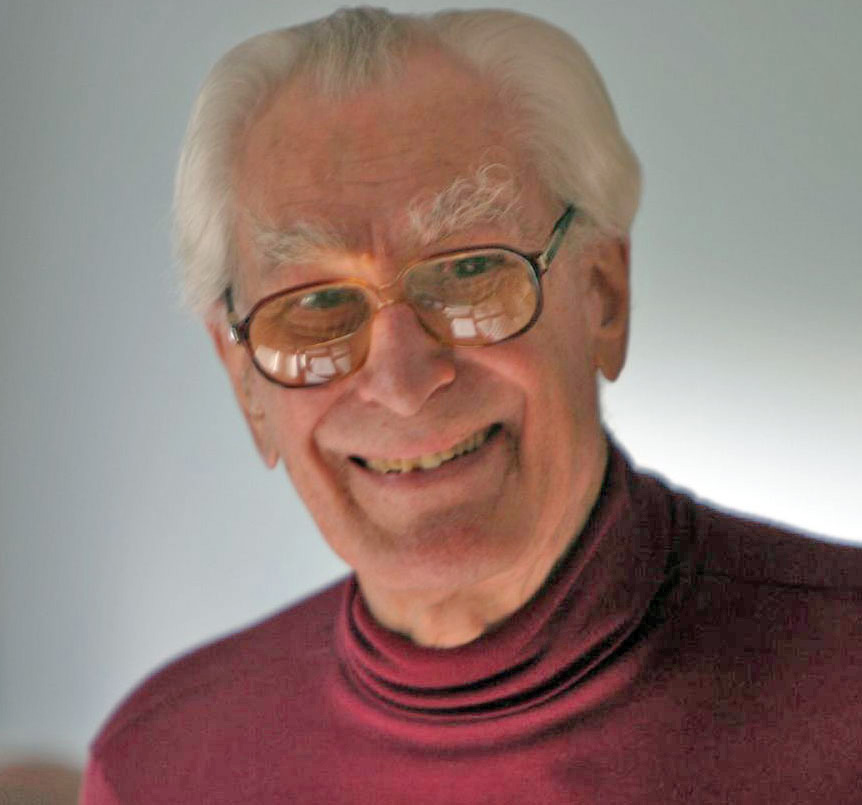
- Guy in 2005
- Born: Richard Kenneth Guy; 30 September 1916; Nuneaton, England
- Died: 9 March 2020 (aged 103); Calgary, Alberta, Canada
- Education: Gonville and Caius College, Cambridge (B.A. in 1938, M.A. in 1941)
- Known for: Recreational mathematics Strong law of small numbers Unistable polyhedron
- Awards: Lester R. Ford Award (1989)
- Scientific career
- Fields: Mathematics
- Workplaces: University of Calgary
- Website: science.ucalgary.ca/mathematics-statistics/about/richard-guy

Richard Kenneth Guy (30 September 1916 – 9 March 2020) was a British mathematician. He was a professor in the Department of Mathematics at the University of Calgary. He is known for his work in number theory, geometry, recreational mathematics, combinatorics, and graph theory. He is best known for co-authorship (with John Conway and Elwyn Berlekamp) of Winning Ways for your Mathematical Plays and authorship of Unsolved Problems in Number Theory. He published more than 300 scholarly articles. Guy proposed the partially tongue-in-cheek "strong law of small numbers", which says there are not enough small integers available for the many tasks assigned to them – thus explaining many coincidences and patterns found among numerous cultures. For this paper he received the MAA Lester R. Ford Award in 1989.

== Biography ==
=== Early life ===
Guy was born 30 September 1916 in Nuneaton, Warwickshire, England, to Adeline Augusta Tanner and William Alexander Charles Guy. Both of his parents were teachers, rising to the rank of headmistress and headmaster, respectively. He attended Warwick School for Boys, the third oldest school in Britain, but was not enthusiastic about most of the curriculum. He was good at sports and excelled in mathematics. At the age of 17 he read Dickson's History of the Theory of Numbers. He said it was better than "the whole works of Shakespeare", solidifying his lifelong interest in mathematics.

In 1935 Guy entered Gonville and Caius College, Cambridge, as a result of winning several scholarships. To win the most important of these he had to travel to Cambridge and write exams for two days. His interest in games began while at Cambridge where he became an avid composer of chess problems. In 1938, he was graduated with a second-class honours degree; he would later state that his failure to get a first may have been related to his obsession with chess. Although his parents strongly advised against it, Guy decided to become a teacher and got a teaching diploma at the University of Birmingham. He met his future wife, Nancy Louise Thirian, through her brother Michael, who was a fellow scholarship winner at Gonville and Caius. He and Louise shared loves of mountain climbing and dancing. They married in December 1940.

=== War years ===
In November 1942, Guy received an emergency commission in the Meteorological Branch of the Royal Air Force, with the rank of flight lieutenant. He was posted to Reykjavík, and later to Bermuda, as a meteorologist. He tried to get permission for Louise to join him but was refused. While in Iceland, he did some glacier travel, skiing, and mountain climbing, marking the beginning of another long love affair, this one with snow and ice. When Guy returned to England after the war, he went back to teaching, this time at Stockport Grammar School, but stayed only two years. In 1947 the family moved to London, where he got a job teaching mathematics at Goldsmiths' College.

=== Later life and death ===
In 1951 he moved to Singapore, where he taught at the University of Malaya until 1962. He then spent a few years at the Indian Institute of Technology in Delhi, India. While they were in India, he and Louise went mountaineering in the foothills of the Himalayas. Guy moved to Canada in 1965, settling down at the University of Calgary in Alberta, where he obtained a professorship. Although he officially retired in 1982, he still went to the office five days a week to work, even as he passed the age of 100. Along with George Thomas and John Selfridge, Guy taught at Canada/USA Mathcamp during its early years.

In 1991 the University of Calgary awarded him an honorary doctorate. Guy said that they gave him the degree out of embarrassment, although the university stated that "his extensive research efforts and prolific writings in the field of number theory and combinatorics have added much to the underpinnings of game theory and its extensive application to many forms of human activity." Guy and his wife Louise (who died in 2010) remained very committed to mountain hiking and environmentalism even in their later years. In 2014, he donated $100,000 to the Alpine Club of Canada for the training of amateur leaders. In turn, the Alpine Club has honoured them by building the Louise and Richard Guy Hut near the base of Mont des Poilus. They had three children, among them computer scientist and mathematician Michael J. T. Guy.

Guy died on 9 March 2020 at the age of 103.

== Mathematics ==
I love mathematics so much, and I love anybody who can do it well, so I just like to hang on and try to copy them as best I can, even though I'm not really in their league.

— R. K. Guy

While teaching in Singapore in 1960 Guy met the Hungarian mathematician Paul Erdős. Erdős was noted for posing and solving difficult mathematical problems and shared several of them with Guy. Guy later recalled "I made some progress in each of them. This gave me encouragement, and I began to think of myself as possibly being something of a research mathematician, which I hadn't done before." Eventually he wrote four papers with Erdős, giving him an Erdős number of 1, and solved one of Erdős' problems. Guy was intrigued by unsolved problems and wrote two books devoted to them. Many number theorists got their start trying to solve problems from Guy's book Unsolved problems in number theory.

Guy described himself as an amateur mathematician, although his work was widely respected by professionals. In a career that spans eight decades he wrote or co-authored more than a dozen books and collaborated with some of the most important mathematicians of the twentieth century. Paul Erdős, John H. Conway, Donald Knuth, and Martin Gardner were among his collaborators, as were Elwyn Berlekamp, John L. Selfridge, Kenneth Falconer, Frank Harary, Lee Sallows, Gerhard Ringel, Béla Bollobás, C. B. Lacampagne, Bruce Sagan, and Neil Sloane.

Over the course of his career Guy published more than 100 research papers in mathematics, including four with Erdős.

Guy was influential in the field of recreational mathematics. He collaborated with Berlekamp and Conway on two volumes of Winning Ways, which Martin Gardner described in 1998 as "the greatest contribution to recreational mathematics in this century". Guy was considered briefly as a replacement for Gardner when the latter retired from the Mathematical Games column at Scientific American. Guy conducted extensive research on Conway's Game of Life, and in 1970, discovered the game's glider. Around 1968, Guy discovered a unistable polyhedron with 19 faces; no such construct with fewer faces was found until 2012. As of 2016 Guy still was active in conducting mathematical work. To mark his 100th birthday friends and colleagues organised a celebration of his life and a tribute song and video was released by Gathering 4 Gardner.

Guy was one of the original directors of the Number Theory Foundation and played an active role in supporting their efforts to "foster a spirit of cooperation and goodwill among the family of number theorists" for more than twenty years.

== Chess problems ==
From 1947 to 1951 Guy was the endings editor for British Chess Magazine. He is known for almost 200 endgame studies. Along with Hugh Blandford and John Roycroft, he is one of the inventors of the GBR code (Guy–Blandford–Roycroft code), a system of representing the position of chess pieces on a chessboard. Publications including EG use it to classify endgame types and to index endgame studies.

Richard Guy endgame composition: 1938

Position: b7 black pawn, d7 black pawn, f7 black pawn, a6 black pawn, b6 white pawn, d6 white pawn, f6 white pawn, a4 black king, c4 black pawn, c3 white pawn, e3 black pawn, g3 black pawn, h3 white pawn, c2 white pawn, e2 white pawn, g2 white pawn, e1 white king

Solution:
1. Kd1 Ka3
2. Kc1 a5
3. h4 a4
4. h5 Ka2
5. h6 a3
6. h7 Ka1
7. h8=N a2
8. Ng6 fxg6
9. f7 g5
10. f8=N g4
11. Ne6 dxe6
12. d7 e5
13. d8=N e4
14. Nc6 bxc6
15. b7 c5
16. Kd1 Kb2
17. b8=Q+ 1-0

== Selected publications ==
=== Books ===
- 1975 (with John L. Selfridge) Optimal coverings of the square, North-Holland, Amsterdam, OCLC Number: 897757276.
- 1976 Packing [1, n] with solutions of ax + by = cz — the unity of combinatorics Atti dei Conv. Lincei, 17, Tomo II, 173–179
- 1981 Unsolved problems in number theory, Springer-Verlag in New York, ISBN 0-387-90593-6
- 1982 Sets of integers whose subsets have distinct sums, North-Holland, OCLC Number: 897757256.
- 1982 (with Elwyn Berlekamp and John H. Conway) Winning Ways for your Mathematical Plays, Academic Press, ISBN 0120911507.
- 1987 Six phases for the eight-lambdas and eight-deltas configurations, North-Holland, OCLC Number: 897693235.
- 1989 Fair game how to play impartial combinatorial games, COMAP in Arlington, MA, ISBN 0912843160.
- 1991 Graphs and the strong law of small numbers in 'Graph Theory, Combinatorics, and Applications, Wiley, OCLC Number: 897682607. ISBN 9780471532194
- 1994 (with Hallard T. Croft and Kenneth Falconer) Unsolved problems in geometry, Springer-Verlag, ISBN 0387975063.
- 1996 (with John H. Conway) The book of numbers, Copernicus, ISBN 9780387979939.
- 2002 (with Paul Vaderlind and Loren C. Larson) The inquisitive problem solver, Mathematical Association of America, ISBN 0883858061.
- 2020 (with Ezra A. Brown) The Unity of Combinatorics, Mathematical Association of America, ISBN 978-1-4704-5279-7

=== Papers ===
- Guy, R. K.; Smith, Cedric A. B. (1956). "The G-values of various games". Math. Proc. Camb. Philos. Soc. 52 (3): 514–526. Bibcode:1956PCPS...52..514G. doi:10.1017/S0305004100031509. S2CID 120605511.
- Guy, R. K. (1958). "Two theorems on partitions". Math. Gaz. 42 (340): 84–86. doi:10.2307/3609388. JSTOR 3609388. S2CID 125687055.
- Guy, R. K.; Harary, Frank (1967). "On the Mobius ladders". Can. Math. Bull. 10 (4): 493–496. doi:10.4153/CMB-1967-046-4. S2CID 124320546.
- Bremner, Andrew; Goggins, Joseph R.; Guy, Michael J. T.; Guy, R. K. (2000). "On rational Morley triangles". Acta Arith. 93 (2): 177–187. doi:10.4064/aa-93-2-177-187.
- Sallows, Lee; Guy, R. K.; Gardner, Martin; Knuth, Donald (1992). "New pathways in serial isogons". Math. Intell. 14 (2): 55–67. doi:10.1007/BF03025216. S2CID 121493484.
- Guy, R. K. (1967). "A coarseness conjecture of Erdös". J. Comb. Theory. 3: 38–42. doi:10.1016/S0021-9800(67)80014-0.
- Guy, R. K.; Kelly, Patrick A. (1968). "The no-three-in-line problem". Can. Math. Bull. 11 (4): 527–531. doi:10.4153/CMB-1968-062-3. S2CID 120649715.
- Guy, R. K.; Jenkyns, Tom; Schaer, Jonathan (1968). "The toroidal crossing number of the complete graph". J. Comb. Theory. 4 (4): 376–390. doi:10.1016/S0021-9800(68)80063-8.
- Guy, R. K. (1969). "A many-facetted problem of zarankiewicz". The Many Facets of Graph theory. Lecture Notes in Mathematics. Vol. 110. pp. 129–148. doi:10.1007/BFb0060112. ISBN 978-3-540-04629-5.
- Guy, R. K.; Jenkyns, Tom (1969). "The toroidal crossing number of K(m,n)". J. Comb. Theory. 6 (3): 236–250. doi:10.1016/S0021-9800(69)80084-0.
- Guy, R. K. (1970). "Latest results on crossing numbers". Recent Trends in Graph Theory. Lecture Notes in Mathematics. Vol. 186. pp. 143–156. doi:10.1007/BFb0059432. ISBN 978-3-540-05386-6.
- Guy, R. K. (1972). "The slimming number and genus of graphs". Can. Math. Bull. 15 (2): 195–200. doi:10.4153/CMB-1972-035-8. S2CID 123893633.
- Guy, R. K. (1972). "Crossing numbers of graphs". Graph Theory and applications. Lecture Notes in Mathematics. Vol. 303. pp. 111–124. doi:10.1007/BFb0067363. ISBN 978-3-540-06096-3.
- Guy, R. K.; Selfridge, J. L. (1975). "What drives an aliquot sequence?". Math. Comput. 29 (129): 101–107. doi:10.1090/S0025-5718-1975-0384669-X.
- Guy, R. K.; Ringel, Gerhard (1976). "Triangular embedding of K_{n} – K_{6}". J. Comb. Theory B. 21 (2): 140–145. doi:10.1016/0095-8956(76)90054-X.
- Béla Bollobás, R. K. Guy (1983). "Equitable and proportional coloring of trees". J. Comb. Theory B. 34 (2): 177–186. doi:10.1016/0095-8956(83)90017-5.
- Guy, R. K.; Selfridge, J. L. (1980). "Corrigendum to 'What drives an aliquot sequence?'". Math. Comput. 34 (149): 319–321. doi:10.1090/S0025-5718-1980-0551309-8.
- Guy, R. K. (1983). "Conway's prime producing machine". Math. Mag. 56 (1): 26–33. doi:10.2307/2690263. JSTOR 2690263.
- Guy, R. K.; Lacampagne, C. B.; Selfridge, J. L. (1987). "Primes at a glance". Math. Comput. 48 (177): 183–202. doi:10.1090/S0025-5718-1987-0866108-3.
- Guy, R. K. (1988). "The strong law of small numbers". Am. Math. Mon. 95 (8): 697–712. doi:10.2307/2322249. JSTOR 2322249.
- Bremner, Andrew; Guy, R. K. (1988). "A dozen difficult diophantine dilemmas". Am. Math. Mon. 95 (1): 31–36. doi:10.2307/2323442. JSTOR 2323442.
- Guy, R. K. (1990). "The second strong law of small numbers". Am. Math. Mon. 63 (1): 3–20. doi:10.2307/2691503. JSTOR 2691503.
- Bremner, Andrew; Guy, R. K. (1992). "Nu-configurations in tiling the square". Math. Comput. 59 (199): 195–202. Bibcode:1992MaCom..59..195B. doi:10.1090/S0025-5718-1992-1134716-2.
- Guy, R. K.; Krattenthaler, C.; Sagan, Bruce E. (1992). "Lattice paths, reflections, and dimension-changing bijections". Ars Combinatoria. 34: 15. CiteSeerX 10.1.1.32.294.
- Bremner, Andrew; Guy, R. K.; Nowakowski, Richard J. (1993). "Which integers are representable as the product of the sum of three integers with the sum of their reciprocals?". Math. Comput. 61 (203): 117–130. Bibcode:1993MaCom..61..117B. doi:10.1090/S0025-5718-1993-1189516-5.
- Guy, R. K. (1994). "Every number is expressible as the sum of how many polygonal numbers?". Am. Math. Mon. 101 (2): 169–72. doi:10.2307/2324367. JSTOR 2324367.
- Guy, R. K.; Nowakowski, Richard (1995). "Coin-Weighing Problems". Am. Math. Mon. 102 (2): 164–167. doi:10.2307/2975353. JSTOR 2975353.
- Guy, R. K. (2000). "Catwalks, sandsteps and pascal pyramids". J. Integer Seq. 3: 00.1.6. Bibcode:2000JIntS...3...16G.
- Conway, John H.; Guy, R. K.; Schneeberger, W. A.; Sloane, N. J. A. (1996–1997). "The primary pretenders". Acta Arith. 78 (4): 307–313. arXiv:math/0207180. doi:10.4064/aa-78-4-307-313.

== Sources ==
- Albers, Donald J.; Alexanderson, Gerald L. (1985). Mathematical People: Profiles and Interviews, John Horton Conway by Richard K. Guy: pp. 36–46, Princeton University Press, ISBN 0817631917
- Albers, Donald J.; Alexanderson, Gerald L. (2011). Fascinating Mathematical People : interviews and memoirs, Interview with Richard K. Guy: pp. 165–192, Princeton University Press, ISBN 0691148295
- Berlekamp, Elwyn R. (2014). The Mathematical Legacy of Martin Gardner Society for Industrial and Applied Mathematics (SIAM), 2 September 2014
- Fortney, Valerie (2015). "Richard Guy to visit his namesake alpine hut" The Calgary Herald, 10 September 2015
- Guiltenane, Erin (2016). Emeritus professor marks a century of life and learning University of Calgary: Faculty of Science, 29 September 2016
- MAA (2016). Happy Birthday, Richard Guy! Archived 25 April 2017 at the Wayback Machine Mathematical Association of America, 30 September 2016
- Mulcahy, Colm (2016). Richard K. Guy turns 100 MAA: CardColm, 30 September 2016
- Roberts, Siobhan (2016). An “Infinitely Rich” Mathematician Turns 100, 30 September 2016
- Scott, Chic (2012). Young at Heart: The Inspirational Lives of Richard and Louise Guy, Pub by The Alpine Club of Canada, Canmore, Alberta, ISBN 978-0-920330-24-1
