= John Selfridge =

American mathematician (1927–2010)

- Born: February 17, 1927; Ketchikan, Alaska, United States
- Died: October 31, 2010 (aged 83); DeKalb, Illinois, United States
- Education: University of California, Los Angeles
- Scientific career
- Fields: Analytic number theory
- Workplaces: University of Illinois at Urbana-Champaign; Northern Illinois University
- Doctoral advisor: Theodore Motzkin

John Lewis Selfridge (February 17, 1927 – October 31, 2010) was an American mathematician who contributed to the fields of analytic number theory, computational number theory, and combinatorics.

== Education ==
Selfridge received his Ph.D. in 1958 from the University of California, Los Angeles under the supervision of Theodore Motzkin.

== Career ==
Selfridge served on the faculties of the University of Illinois at Urbana-Champaign and Northern Illinois University (NIU) from 1971 to 1991 (retirement), chairing the NIU Department of Mathematical Sciences 1972–1976 and 1986–1990. He was executive editor of Mathematical Reviews from 1978 to 1986, overseeing the computerization of its operations. He was a founder of the Number Theory Foundation, which has named its Selfridge prize in his honour.

== Research ==
In 1962, he proved that 78,557 is a Sierpinski number; he showed that, when k = 78,557, all numbers of the form k2^{n} + 1 have a factor in the covering set {3, 5, 7, 13, 19, 37, 73}. Five years later, he and Sierpiński conjectured that 78,557 is the smallest Sierpinski number, and thus the answer to the Sierpinski problem. A distributed computing project, Seventeen or Bust, is devoted to finding a computational proof of this statement.

In 1964, Selfridge and Alexander Hurwitz proved that the 14th Fermat number $2^{2^{14}} + 1$ was composite. However, their proof did not provide a factor. It was not until 2010 that the first factor of the 14th Fermat number was found.

In 1975 John Brillhart, Derrick Henry Lehmer, and Selfridge developed a method of proving the primality of p given only partial factorizations of p − 1 and p + 1. Together with Samuel Wagstaff they also all participated in the Cunningham project.

Together with Paul Erdős, Selfridge solved a 150-year-old problem, proving that the product of consecutive numbers is never a power. It took them many years to find the proof, and John made extensive use of computers, but the final version of the proof requires only a modest amount of computation, namely evaluating an easily computed function f(n) for 30,000 consecutive values of n. Selfridge suffered from writer's block and thanked "R. B. Eggleton for reorganizing and writing the paper in its final form".

Selfridge also developed the Selfridge–Conway discrete procedure for creating an envy-free cake-cutting among three people. Selfridge developed this in 1960, and John Conway independently discovered it in 1993. Neither of them ever published the result, but Richard Guy told many people Selfridge's solution in the 1960s, and it was eventually attributed to the two of them in a number of books and articles.

=== Conjecture about Fermat numbers ===
Selfridge made the following conjecture about the Fermat numbers F_{n} = 2^{2^{n}} + 1 . Let g(n) be the number of distinct prime factors of F_{n} (sequence A046052 in the OEIS). As to 2024, g(n) is known only up to n = 11, and it is monotonic. Selfridge conjectured that contrary to appearances, g(n) is not monotonic. In support of his conjecture he showed a sufficient (but not necessary) condition for its truth is the existence of another Fermat prime beyond the five known (3, 5, 17, 257, 65537).

=== Conjectured primality test ===
This conjecture is also called the PSW conjecture, after Selfridge, Carl Pomerance, and Samuel Wagstaff.

Let p be an odd number, with p ≡ ± 2 (mod 5). Selfridge conjectured that if

- 2^{p−1} ≡ 1 (mod p) and at the same time
- f_{p+1} ≡ 0 (mod p),

where f_{k} is the kth Fibonacci number, then p is a prime number, and he offered $500 for a counterexample. He also offered $20 for a proof that the conjecture was true. The Number Theory Foundation will now cover this prize. A counterexample will actually earn its discoverer $620, because Samuel Wagstaff offers $100 for a counterexample or a proof, and Carl Pomerance offers $20 for a counterexample and $500 for a proof. Selfridge requires that a factorization be supplied, but Pomerance does not. The related test that f_{p−1} ≡ 0 (mod p) for p ≡ ±1 (mod 5) is unsound: the smallest counterexample for p ≡ 1 (mod 5) is 6601 = 7 × 23 × 41 and the smallest for p ≡ −1 (mod 5) is 30889 = 17 × 23 × 79. Pomerance has given a heuristic argument suggesting that Selfridge's conjecture is likely to be false (i.e. that a counterexample is likely to exist).

== See also ==
- Sierpinski number
- New Mersenne conjecture
- Lander, Parkin, and Selfridge conjecture
- Erdős–Selfridge function at Wolfram MathWorld

== Publications ==
- Pirani, F. A. E.; Moser, Leo; Selfridge, John (1950). "Elementary Problems and Solutions: Solutions: E903". Am. Math. Mon. 57 (8): 561–562. doi:10.2307/2307953. JSTOR 2307953. MR 1527674.
- Carl Pomerance; John L. Selfridge; Samuel S. Wagstaff, Jr. (July 1980). "The pseudoprimes to 25·10^{9}" (PDF). Math. Comput. 35 (151): 1003–1026. doi:10.1090/S0025-5718-1980-0572872-7. JSTOR 2006210.
- Eggan, L. C.; Eggan, Peter C.; Selfridge, J. L. (1982). "Polygonal products of polygonal numbers and the Pell equation". Fibonacci Quarterly. 20 (1): 24–28. MR 0660755.
- Erdos, P; Selfridge, J. L. (1982). "Another property of 239 and some related questions". Congr. Numer.: 243–257. MR 0681710.
- Lacampagne, C. B.; Selfridge, J. L. (1985). "Large highly powerful numbers are cubeful" (PDF). Rocky Mountain Journal of Mathematics. 15 (2): 459. doi:10.1216/rmj-1985-15-2-459. MR 0823257. S2CID 120373455.
- Lacampagne, C. B.; Selfridge, J. L. (1986). "Pairs of squares with consecutive digits". Math. Mag. 59 (5): 270–275. doi:10.2307/2689401. JSTOR 2689401. MR 0868804.
- Blair, W. D.; Lacampagne, C. B.; Selfridge, J. L. (1986). "Notes: Factoring Large Numbers on a Pocket Calculator". Am. Math. Mon. 93 (10): 802–808. doi:10.2307/2322936. JSTOR 2322936. MR 1540993.
- Guy, R. K.; Lacampagne, C. B.; Selfridge, J. L. (1987). "Primes at a glance". Math. Comput. 48 (177): 183–202. doi:10.1090/s0025-5718-1987-0866108-3. MR 0866108.
- Trench, William F.; Rodriguez, R. S.; Sherwood, H.; Reznick, Bruce A.; Rubel, Lee A.; Golomb, Solomon W.; Kinnon, Nick M.; Erdos, Paul; Selfridge, John (1988). "Problems and Solutions: Elementary Problems: E3243–E3248". Am. Math. Mon. 95 (1): 50–51. doi:10.2307/2323449. JSTOR 2323449. MR 1541238.
- Erdos, P.; Lacampagne, C. B.; Selfridge, J. L. (1988). "Prime factors of binomial coefficients and related problems". Acta Arith. 49 (5): 507–523. doi:10.4064/aa-49-5-507-523. MR 0967334.
- Bateman, P. T.; Selfridge, J. L.; Wagstaff, S. S. (1989). "The New Mersenne conjecture". Am. Math. Mon. 96 (2): 125–128. doi:10.2307/2323195. JSTOR 2323195. MR 0992073.
- Lacampagne, C. B.; Nicol, C. A.; Selfridge, J. L. (1990). "Sets with nonsquarefree sums". Number Theory. de Gruyter. pp. 299–311.
- Howie, John M.; Selfridge, J. L. (1991). "A semigroup embedding problem and an arithmetical function". Mathematical Proceedings of the Cambridge Philosophical Society. 109 (2): 277–286. Bibcode:1991MPCPS.109..277H. doi:10.1017/s0305004100069747. MR 1085395. S2CID 120671857.
- Eggleton, R. B.; Lacampagne, C. B.; Selfridge, J. L. (1992). "Eulidean quadratic fields". Am. Math. Mon. 99 (9): 829–837. doi:10.2307/2324118. JSTOR 2324118. MR 1191702.
- Erdős, P.; Lacampagne, C. B.; Selfridge, J. L. (1993). "Estimates of the least prime factor of a binomial coefficient". Mathematics of Computation. 61 (203): 215–224. Bibcode:1993MaCom..61..215E. doi:10.1090/s0025-5718-1993-1199990-6. MR 1199990.
- Lin, Cantian; Selfridge, J. L.; Shiue, Peter Jau-shyong (1995). "A note on periodic complementary binary sequences". J. Comb. Math. Comb. Comput. 19: 225–29. MR 1358509.
- Blecksmith, Richard; McCallum, Michael; Selfridge, J. L. (1998). "3-smooth representations of integers". Am. Math. Mon. 105 (6): 529–543. doi:10.2307/2589404. JSTOR 2589404. MR 1626189.
- Blecksmith, Richard; Erdos, Paul; Selfridge, J. L. (1999). "cluster primes". Am. Math. Mon. 106 (1): 43–48. doi:10.2307/2589585. JSTOR 2589585. MR 1674129.
- Erdős, Paul; Malouf, Janice L.; Selfridge, J. L.; Szekeres, Esther (1999). "Subsets of an interval whose product is a power". Discrete Mathematics. 200 (1–3): 137–147. doi:10.1016/s0012-365x(98)00332-x. MR 1692286.
- Granville, Andrew; Selfridge, J. L. (2001). "Product of integers in an interval, modulo squares". Electron. J. Comb. 8 (1): #R5. doi:10.37236/1549. MR 1814512.
