= Fibonacci Association =

Organization for research on Fibonacci numbers

The Fibonacci Association is a mathematical organization that specializes in the Fibonacci number sequence and related topics in mathematics.

== History ==
The organization was founded in 1963 by Brother Alfred Brousseau FSC of Saint Mary's College of California and Verner E. Hoggatt Jr. of San Jose State College (now San Jose State University), together with Stanley L. Basin, Terrance A. Brennan, Paul F. Byrd, and I. Dale Ruggles.

== Publications ==
Since the year of its founding, the Fibonacci Association has published an international mathematical journal, The Fibonacci Quarterly.

The Fibonacci Association also publishes proceedings for its international conferences, held every two years since 1984.
