= Jennifer Balakrishnan =

American mathematician

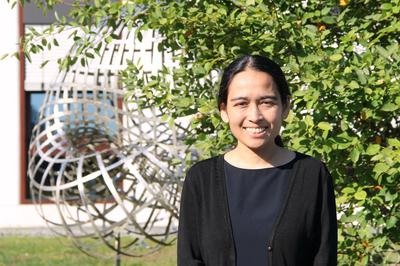
- Jennifer Balakrishnan (2018)
- Education: Harvard University; MIT
- Awards: Fellow, American Mathematical Society (2022); AWM-Microsoft Research Prize (2022); NSF CAREER Award (2020); Sloan Fellowship (2018)
- Scientific career
- Fields: Mathematics
- Workplaces: Boston University
- Thesis: Coleman integration for hyperelliptic curves: algorithms and applications (2011)
- Doctoral advisor: Kiran Kedlaya
- Website: math.bu.edu/people/jbala/

Jennifer Shyamala Sayaka Balakrishnan is an American mathematician known for leading a team that solved the problem of the "cursed curve", a Diophantine equation that was known for being "famously difficult". More generally, Balakrishnan specializes in algorithmic number theory and arithmetic geometry. She is a Clare Boothe Luce Professor at Boston University.

== Education and career ==
Balakrishnan was born in Mangilao, Guam to Narayana and Shizuko Balakrishnan; her father is a professor of chemistry at the University of Guam. As a junior at Harvest Christian Academy, Balakrishnan won an honorable mention in the 2001 Karl Menger Memorial Award competition, for the best mathematical project in the Intel International Science and Engineering Fair. Her project concerned elliptic coordinate systems. In the following year, she won the National High School Student Calculus Competition, given as part of the United States of America Mathematical Olympiad.

Balakrishnan graduated from Harvard University in 2006, with both a magna cum laude bachelor's degree and a master's degree in mathematics. She moved to the Massachusetts Institute of Technology for her doctoral studies, completing her Ph.D. in 2011. Her dissertation, Coleman integration for hyperelliptic curves: algorithms and applications, was supervised by Kiran Kedlaya.

She returned to Harvard for her postdoctoral studies from 2011 to 2013, and then moved to the University of Oxford from 2013 to 2016, where she was a Junior Research Fellow in Balliol College and a Titchmarsh Research Fellow in the Mathematical Institute. She became Clare Booth Luce Assistant Professor at Boston University in 2016, Clare Booth Luce Associate Professor in 2021, and Clare Booth Luce Professor in 2023.

Balakrishnan is one of the principal investigators in the Simons Collaboration on Arithmetic Geometry, Number Theory, and Computation, a large multi-university collaboration involving Boston University, Harvard, MIT, Brown University, and Dartmouth College, with additional collaborators from other universities in the US, England, Australia, the Netherlands, and Canada.. She also serves on the board of directors of the Number Theory Foundation and the editorial boards of Research in Number Theory and Mathematics of Computation. She serves on the Scientific Advisory Board for the Institute for Computational and Experimental Research in Mathematics (ICERM).

== Contributions ==
In 2017, Balakrishnan led a team of mathematicians in settling the problem of the "cursed curve" $X_s(13)$. This curve is modeled by the equation

$$y^4+5x^4-6x^2y^2+6x^3z+26x^2yz+10xy^2z-10y^3z-32x^2z^2-40xyz^2+24y^2z^2+32xz^3-16yz^3=0$$

and, as a Diophantine equation, the problem is to determine all rational solutions, i.e., assignments of rational numbers to the variables $x$, $y$, and $z$ for which the equation is true.

Although as an explicit equation this curve has a complicated form, it is natural and conceptually significant in the number theory of elliptic curves. The equation describes a modular curve whose solutions characterize the one remaining unsolved case of a theorem of Bilu, Parent & Rebolledo (2013) on the Galois representations of elliptic curves without complex multiplication. Computations by Galbraith (2002) and Baran (2014) had previously identified seven solutions on the cursed curve (six corresponding to elliptic curves with complex multiplication, and one cusp), but their computational methods were unable to show that the list of solutions was complete. Following a suggestion of Oxford mathematician Minhyong Kim, Balakrishnan and her co-authors constructed a "Selmer variety" associated with the curve, such that the rational points of the curve all lie on the Selmer variety as well, and such that the number of points of intersection of the curve and the variety can be computed. Using this method, they proved that the seven known solutions to the cursed curve are the only ones possible. This work was initially reported in a 2017 arXiv preprint and was published in the journal Annals of Mathematics in 2019.

Balakrishnan has researched, with Ken Ono and others, Lehmer's question on whether the Ramanujan tau function $\tau(n)$ is ever zero for a positive integer n.

As well as for her work in number theory, Balakrishnan is known for her work implementing number-theoretical algorithms as part of the SageMath computer algebra system.

== Recognition ==
Balakrishnan received the Clare Boothe Luce Assistant Professorship in 2016. In 2018, Balakrishnan was selected as a Sloan Research Fellow. In 2020, she was selected for a National Science Foundation CAREER Award. She was named a Fellow of the American Mathematical Society, in the 2022 class of fellows, "for contributions to arithmetic geometry and computational number theory and service to the profession". She earned the 2022 AWM–Microsoft Research Prize in Algebra and Number Theory in recognition of her "outstanding contributions to explicit methods in number theory, particularly her advances in computing rational points on algebraic curves over number fields". She was selected as a Fellow of the Association for Women in Mathematics in the class of 2023 "for her support of women in mathematics through mentoring and advising; for organizing and supporting programs for women and girls, especially Women in Sage and Women in Numbers; for her work in outreach and education, including GirlsGetMath; and for working to improve diversity, equity, and inclusion in research communities. In 2023 she was awarded the 2023-2024 AMS-Birman Fellowship.

== Selected publications ==
- Balakrishnan, Jennifer S.; Bradshaw, Robert W.; Kedlaya, Kiran S (2010). "Explicit Coleman integration for hyperelliptic curves". Algorithmic number theory, 16–31, Lecture Notes in Comput. Sci., 6197, Springer, Berlin. MR2721410.
- Balakrishnan, Jennifer S.; Besser, Amnon (2012). "Computing local p-adic height pairings on hyperelliptic curves". Int. Math. Res. Not., no. 11, 2405–2444. MR2926986.
- Balakrishnan, Jennifer S.; Besser, Amnon; Müller, J. Steffen (2016). "Quadratic Chabauty: p-adic heights and integral points on hyperelliptic curves". J. Reine Angew. Math. 720, 51–79. MR3565969.
- Balakrishnan, Jennifer S.; Dogra, Netan (2018). "Quadratic Chabauty and rational points I: p-adic heights". With an appendix by J. Steffen Müller. Duke Math. J. 167, no. 11, 1981-2038. MR3843370.
- Balakrishnan, Jennifer S.; Dogra, Netan; Müller, J. Steffen; Tuitman, Jan; Vonk, Jan (2019). "Explicit Chabauty-Kim for the split Cartan modular curve of level 13". Ann. of Math. 189, no. 3, 885-944. MR3961086
