= Andrew Sutherland =

Andrew Sutherland may refer to:

- Andrew Sutherland (mathematician), American mathematician specializing in number theory
- Andrew Sutherland (politician) (1882–1961), New Zealand politician
