= Sums of three cubes =

Problem in number theory

Unsolved problem in mathematics
Is there a number that is not 4 or 5 modulo 9 and that cannot be expressed as a sum of three cubes?
More unsolved problems in mathematics

Semi-log plot of solutions of $x^3+y^3+z^3=n$ for integer $x$, $y$, and $z$, and $0\le n\le 100$. Green bands denote values of $n$ proven not to have a solution.

In the mathematics of sums of powers, it is an open problem to characterize the numbers that can be expressed as a sum of three cubes of integers, allowing both positive and negative cubes in the sum. A necessary condition for an integer $n$ to equal such a sum is that $n$ cannot equal 4 or 5 modulo 9, because the cubes modulo 9 are 0, 1, and −1, and no three of these numbers can sum to 4 or 5 modulo 9. It is unknown whether this necessary condition is sufficient.

Variations of the problem include sums of non-negative cubes and sums of rational cubes. All integers have a representation as a sum of rational cubes, but it is unknown whether the sums of non-negative cubes form a set with non-zero natural density.

== Small cases ==
A nontrivial representation of 0 as a sum of three cubes would give a counterexample to Fermat's Last Theorem for the exponent three, as one of the three cubes would have the opposite sign as the other two and its negation would equal the sum of the other two. Therefore, by Leonhard Euler's proof of that case of Fermat's last theorem, there are only the trivial solutions

$$a^3 + (-a)^3 + 0^3 = 0.$$

For representations of 1 and 2, there are infinite families of solutions

$(9b^4)^3+(3b-9b^4)^3+(1-9b^3)^3=1$ (discovered by K. Mahler in 1936)

and

$(1+6c^3)^3+(1-6c^3)^3+(-6c^2)^3=2$ (discovered by A.S. Verebrusov in 1908, quoted by L.J. Mordell).

These can be scaled to obtain representations for any cube or any number that is twice a cube. There are also other known representations of 2 that are not given by these infinite families:

$$1\ 214\ 928^3 + 3\ 480\ 205^3 + (-3\ 528\ 875)^3 = 2,$$
$$37\ 404\ 275\ 617^3 + (-25\ 282\ 289\ 375)^3 + (-33\ 071\ 554\ 596)^3 = 2,$$
$$3\ 737\ 830\ 626\ 090^3 + 1\ 490\ 220\ 318\ 001^3 + (-3\ 815\ 176\ 160\ 999)^3 = 2.$$

However, 1 and 2 are the only numbers with representations that can be parameterized by quartic polynomials as above. Even in the case of representations of 3, Louis J. Mordell wrote in 1953 "I do not know anything" more than its small solutions

$$1^3+1^3+1^3=4^3+4^3+(-5)^3=3$$

and the fact that each of the three cubed numbers must be equal modulo 9.

== Computational results ==
Since 1955, and starting with the instigation of Mordell, many authors have implemented computational searches for these representations. Elsenhans & Jahnel (2009) used a method of Noam Elkies (2000) involving lattice reduction to search for all solutions to the Diophantine equation

$$x^3+y^3+z^3=n$$

for positive $n$ at most 1000 and for $\max(|x|,|y|,|z|)<10^{14}$. The result of this search left only 33, 42, 74, 114, 165, 390, 579, 627, 633, 732, 795, 906, 921, and 975 as open problems for $n\le 1000$ as of 2009. After Timothy Browning covered the problem on Numberphile in 2016, Huisman (2016) extended these searches to $\max(|x|,|y|,|z|)<10^{15}$, solving the case of 74, with solution

$$74=(-284\ 650\ 292\ 555\ 885)^3+66\ 229\ 832\ 190\ 556^3+283\ 450\ 105\ 697\ 727^3.$$

In 2019, Andrew Booker settled the case $n=33$ by discovering that

$$33=8\ 866\ 128\ 975\ 287\ 528^3+(-8\ 778\ 405\ 442\ 862\ 239)^3+(-2\ 736\ 111\ 468\ 807\ 040)^3.$$

In order to achieve this, Booker exploited an alternative search strategy with running time proportional to $\min(|x|,|y|,|z|)$ rather than to their maximum, an approach originally suggested by Heath-Brown et al. Booker also found that

$$795=(-14\ 219\ 049\ 725\ 358\ 227)^3 + 14\ 197\ 965\ 759\ 741\ 571^3 + 2\ 337\ 348\ 783\ 323\ 923^3,$$

and established that there are no solutions for $n=42$ or any of the other unresolved $n \le 1000$ with $|z|\le 10^{16}$. Shortly thereafter, in September 2019, Booker and Andrew Sutherland settled the case $n=42$, using 1.3 million hours of computing on the Charity Engine global grid to discover that

$$42=(-80\ 538\ 738\ 812\ 075\ 974)^3 + 80\ 435\ 758\ 145\ 817\ 515^3 + 12\ 602\ 123\ 297\ 335\ 631^3,$$

as well as solutions for several other previously unknown cases including $n=165$ and $579$.

Booker and Sutherland also found a third representation of 3 using a further 4 million computer-hours on Charity Engine:

$3 = 569\ 936\ 821\ 221\ 962\ 380\ 720^3 + (-569\ 936\ 821\ 113\ 563\ 493\ 509)^3 + (-472\ 715\ 493\ 453\ 327\ 032)^3.$

This discovery settled a 65-year-old question of Louis J. Mordell that has stimulated much of the research on this problem.

While presenting the third representation of 3 during his appearance in a video on the YouTube channel Numberphile, Booker also presented a representation for 906:

$906 = (-74\ 924\ 259\ 395\ 610\ 397)^3 + 72\ 054\ 089\ 679\ 353\ 378^3 + 35\ 961\ 979\ 615\ 356\ 503^3.$

The only remaining unsolved cases up to 1,000 are the seven numbers 114, 390, 627, 633, 732, 921, and 975. In addition, there are no known primitive solutions (that is, with $\gcd(x,y,z)=1$) for 375.

In November 2026, independent discovery of a primitive solution

$$192 = 2\ 642\ 071\ 652\ 785\ 051^3 + (-2\ 641\ 770\ 614\ 653\ 715)^3 + (-184\ 725\ 770\ 857\ 094)^3$$

for $n=192$ was made by Jeffrey Banks. This solution represents one of two remaining holdouts for missing primitive solutions where only parametric representations were known.

Primitive solutions for n from 1 to 78
n	x	y	z	n	x	y	z
1	9	10	−12	39	117367	134476	−159380
2	1214928	3480205	−3528875	42	12602123297335631	80435758145817515	−80538738812075974
3	1	1	1	43	2	2	3
6	−1	−1	2	44	−5	−7	8
7	0	−1	2	45	2	−3	4
8	9	15	−16	46	−2	3	3
9	0	1	2	47	6	7	−8
10	1	1	2	48	−23	−26	31
11	−2	−2	3	51	602	659	−796
12	7	10	−11	52	23961292454	60702901317	−61922712865
15	−1	2	2	53	−1	3	3
16	−511	−1609	1626	54	−7	−11	12
17	1	2	2	55	1	3	3
18	−1	−2	3	56	−11	−21	22
19	0	−2	3	57	1	−2	4
20	1	−2	3	60	−1	−4	5
21	−11	−14	16	61	0	−4	5
24	−2901096694	−15550555555	15584139827	62	2	3	3
25	−1	−1	3	63	0	−1	4
26	0	−1	3	64	−3	−5	6
27	−4	−5	6	65	0	1	4
28	0	1	3	66	1	1	4
29	1	1	3	69	2	−4	5
30	−283059965	−2218888517	2220422932	70	11	20	−21
33	−2736111468807040	−8778405442862239	8866128975287528	71	−1	2	4
34	−1	2	3	72	7	9	−10
35	0	2	3	73	1	2	4
36	1	2	3	74	66229832190556	283450105697727	−284650292555885
37	0	−3	4	75	4381159	435203083	−435203231
38	1	−3	4	78	26	53	−55

== Popular interest ==
The sums of three cubes problem has been popularized in recent years by Brady Haran, creator of the YouTube channel Numberphile, beginning with the 2015 video "The Uncracked Problem with 33" featuring an interview with Timothy Browning. This was followed six months later by the video "74 is Cracked" with Browning, discussing Huisman's 2016 discovery of a solution for 74. In 2019, Numberphile published three related videos, "42 is the new 33", "The mystery of 42 is solved", and "3 as the sum of 3 cubes", to commemorate the discovery of solutions for 33, 42, and the new solution for 3.

Booker's solution for 33 was featured in articles appearing in Quanta Magazine and New Scientist, as well as an article in Newsweek in which Booker's collaboration with Sutherland was announced: "...the mathematician is now working with Andrew Sutherland of MIT in an attempt to find the solution for the final unsolved number below a hundred: 42". The number 42 has additional popular interest due to its appearance in the 1979 Douglas Adams science fiction novel The Hitchhiker's Guide to the Galaxy as the answer to The Ultimate Question of Life, the Universe, and Everything.

Booker and Sutherland's announcements of a solution for 42 received international press coverage, including articles in New Scientist, Scientific American, Popular Mechanics, The Register, Die Zeit, Der Tagesspiegel, Helsingin Sanomat, Der Spiegel, New Zealand Herald, Indian Express, Der Standard, Las Provincias, Nettavisen, Digi24, and BBC World Service. Popular Mechanics named the solution for 42 as one of the "10 Biggest Math Breakthroughs of 2019".

The resolution of Mordell's question by Booker and Sutherland a few weeks later sparked another round of news coverage.

In Booker's invited talk at the fourteenth Algorithmic Number Theory Symposium he discusses some of the popular interest in this problem and the public reaction to the announcement of solutions for 33 and 42.

== Solvability and decidability ==
In 1992, Roger Heath-Brown conjectured that every $n$ unequal to 4 or 5 modulo 9 has infinitely many representations as sums of three cubes. The case $n=33$ of this problem was used by Bjorn Poonen as the opening example in a survey on undecidable problems in number theory, of which Hilbert's tenth problem is the most famous example. Although this particular case has since been resolved, it is unknown whether representing numbers as sums of cubes is decidable. That is, it is not known whether an algorithm can, for every input, test in finite time whether a given number has such a representation. If Heath-Brown's conjecture is true, the problem is decidable. In this case, an algorithm could correctly solve the problem by computing $n$ modulo 9, returning false when this is 4 or 5, and otherwise returning true. Heath-Brown's research also includes more precise conjectures on how far an algorithm would have to search to find an explicit representation rather than merely determining whether one exists.

== Variations ==
A variant of this problem related to Waring's problem asks for representations as sums of three cubes of non-negative integers. In the 19th century, Carl Gustav Jacob Jacobi and collaborators compiled tables of solutions to this problem. It is conjectured that the representable numbers have positive natural density. This remains unknown, but Trevor Wooley has shown that $\Omega(n^{0.917})$ of the numbers from $1$ to $n$ have such representations. The density is at most $\Gamma(4/3)^3/6\approx 0.119$.

Every integer can be represented as a sum of three cubes of rational numbers (rather than as a sum of cubes of integers).

== See also ==
- Sum of four cubes problem, whether every integer is a sum of four cubes
- Euler's sum of powers conjecture § k = 3, relating to cubes that can be written as a sum of three positive cubes
- Plato's number, an ancient text possibly discussing the equation 3^{3} + 4^{3} + 5^{3} = 6^{3}
- Taxicab number, the smallest integer that can be expressed as a sum of two positive integer cubes in n distinct ways
