= The Book of Numbers (math book) =

1996 math book by John Conway and Richard Guy

- Author: John H. Conway and Richard K. Guy
- Language: English
- Subject: Number theory
- Publisher: Copernicus Publications
- Publication date: September 27, 1996
- Pages: 310 pp.
- ISBN: 978-0-387-97993-9

The Book of Numbers is a 1996 mathematics book by John H. Conway and Richard K. Guy. It discusses individual numbers, and types of number, that have proved conceptually significant. Topics include the origin of the nursery rhyme "Hickory Dickory Dock", figurate numbers, the Fibonacci sequence, transcendental numbers, the Metonic cycle, combinatorics, the complex plane, nimbers, and surreal numbers.

The Basic Library List Committee of the Mathematical Association of America has recommended that it be included in undergraduate mathematics libraries.

== Reception ==
Andrew Bremner called the book "a delight" and opined that readers of Martin Gardner would appreciate it. A. Robert Pargeter found it "fascinating" both for systematic reading and for browsing, and he recommended that school and college libraries carry it.

Sarah Gourlie called the book "organized and enlightening", while observing that some topics were considerably more demanding than others. Likewise, reviewing the book for the Mathematical Association of America, Allen Stenger noted that while the book only presumed knowledge of high-school algebra and trigonometry, it also in places demanded a "high level of mathematical reasoning". Stenger expected that many readers would be unable to follow all of the explanations unaided. A retrospective by Ezra Brown also commented on the "more than a little sophistication" required to follow some of Conway and Guy's discussions, while finding that the authors' joy "comes through on every page".

The MacTutor History of Mathematics Archive quotes a review of this book in its biography of Conway, saying that "the publishers should have been required to post a warning label on the front cover indicating that this book contains extremely addictive material."
