= Algorithmic Number Theory Symposium =

Biennial conference series on computational number theory

Algorithmic Number Theory Symposium (ANTS) is a biennial academic conference, first held in Cornell in 1994, constituting an international forum for the presentation of new research in computational number theory. They are devoted to algorithmic aspects of number theory, including elementary number theory, algebraic number theory, analytic number theory, geometry of numbers, arithmetic geometry, finite fields, and cryptography.

== Selfridge Prize ==
In honour of the many contributions of John Selfridge to mathematics, the Number Theory Foundation has established a prize to be awarded to those individuals who have authored the best paper accepted for presentation at ANTS. The prize, called the Selfridge Prize, is awarded every two years in an even numbered year. The prize winner(s) receive a cash award and a sculpture.

The prize winners and their papers selected by the ANTS Program Committee are:

- 2006 – ANTS VII – Werner Bley and Robert Boltje – Computation of locally free class groups.
- 2008 – ANTS VIII – Juliana Belding, Reinier Bröker, Andreas Enge and Kristin Lauter – Computing hilbert class polynomials.
- 2010 – ANTS IX – John Voight – Computing automorphic forms on Shimura curves over fields with arbitrary class number.
- 2012 – ANTS X – Andrew Sutherland – On the evaluation of modular polynomials.
- 2014 – ANTS XI – Tom Fisher – Minimal models for 6-coverings of elliptic curves.
- 2016 – ANTS XII – Jan Steffen Müller and Michael Stoll – Computing canonical heights on elliptic curves in quasi-linear time.
- 2018 – ANTS XIII – Michael Musty, Sam Schiavone, Jeroen Sijsling and John Voight – A database of Belyĭ maps.
- 2020 – ANTS XIV – Jonathan Love and Dan Boneh – Supersingular curves with small non-integer endomorphisms.
- 2022 – ANTS XV – Harald Helfgott and Lola Thompson – Summing mu(n): a faster elementary algorithm.
- 2024 – ANTS XVI – Erik Mulder – Fast square-free decomposition of integers using class groups.
- 2026 – ANTS XVII – Jacob Mayle and Jeremy Rouse – Rational points on modular curves via maps to elliptic curves with rank zero.

== Proceedings ==
Prior to ANTS X, the refereed Proceedings of ANTS were published in the Springer Lecture Notes in Computer Science (LNCS). The proceedings of ANTS X, ANTS XIII, and ANTS XIV were published in the Mathematical Sciences Publishers Open Book Series (OBS). The proceedings of ANTS XI and ANTS XII were published as a special issue of the LMS Journal of Computation and Mathematics (JCM). The proceedings for ANTS XV and ANTS XVI were or will be published in Research in Number Theory.

== Conferences ==
- 1994: ANTS I – Cornell University (Ithaca, NY, USA) – LNCS 877
- 1996: ANTS II – Universite Bordeaux 1 (Talence, FR) – LNCS 1122
- 1998: ANTS III – Reed College (Portland, OR, USA) – LNCS 1423
- 2000: ANTS IV – Universiteit Leiden (Leiden, NL) – LNCS 1838
- 2002: ANTS V – University of Sydney (Sydney, AU) – LNCS 2369
- 2004: ANTS VI – University of Vermont (Burlington, VT, USA) – LNCS 3076
- 2006: ANTS VII – Technische Universität Berlin (Berlin, DE) – LNCS 4076
- 2008: ANTS VIII – Banff Centre (Banff, AB, CA) – LNCS 5011
- 2010: ANTS IX – INRIA (Nancy, FR) – LNCS 6197
- 2012: ANTS X – University of California, San Diego (San Diego, CA, USA) – OBS 1
- 2014: ANTS XI – Hotel Hyundai (Gyeongju, KR) – JCM 17A
- 2016: ANTS XII – University of Kaiserslautern (Kaiserslautern, DE) –JCM 19A
- 2018: ANTS XIII – University of Wisconsin, Madison – (Madison, WI, USA) – OBS 2
- 2020: ANTS XIV – University of Auckland (Auckland, NZ)^{*} - OBS 4
- 2022: ANTS XV – University of Bristol (Bristol, UK)
- 2024: ANTS XVI - Massachusetts Institute of Technology (Cambridge, MA, USA)
- 2026: ANTS XVII - University of Groningen (Groningen, Netherlands)

^{*}Moved online due to COVID-19.
