= Melody Chan =

American mathematician and violinist

Melody Tung Chan is an American mathematician and violinist who works as Associate Professor of Mathematics at Brown University. She is a winner of the Alice T. Schafer Prize and of the AWM–Microsoft Research Prize in Algebra and Number Theory. Her research involves combinatorial commutative algebra, graph theory, and tropical geometry.

== Education and career ==
Chan was inspired to become a violinist as a pre-schooler, seeing Yo-Yo Ma on Sesame Street. As a freshman at Scarsdale High School in Scarsdale, New York, she became the youngest first place winner of the 1997 Young Artists Competition of the Sarah Lawrence College chamber orchestra. She studied violin at Juilliard School with Itzhak Perlman and Dorothy DeLay from 2000 to 2001. In 2002, she played a Vivaldi concerto for four violins alongside Perlman in a performance at the Lincoln Center for the Performing Arts that was broadcast on PBS.

She then majored in computer science and mathematics at Yale University. At Yale she played violin in the Yale Symphony Orchestra, won a Barry M. Goldwater Scholarship and the university's Hart Lyman Prize for best junior student, and became vice president of the local chapter of Phi Beta Kappa. She graduated summa cum laude from Yale in 2005.

After studying for the Mathematical Tripos at the University of Cambridge from 2005 to 2006, Chan worked with Paul Seymour at Princeton University, completing a master's degree there in 2008. She completed her doctorate in 2012 at the University of California, Berkeley. Her dissertation, Tropical curves and metric graphs, was supervised by Bernd Sturmfels.

Chan conducted postdoctoral research at Harvard University from 2012 to 2015, and then joined Brown as Manning Assistant Professor in 2015.

== Recognition ==
As an undergraduate at Yale, Chan won the 2005 Alice T. Schafer Prize for her undergraduate research, which resulted in three published papers on distinguishing colorings of Cayley graphs.

Chan was given a Sloan Research Fellowship in 2018. She is the 2020 winner of the AWM–Microsoft Research Prize in Algebra and Number Theory, "in recognition of Chan’s advances at the interface between algebraic geometry and combinatorics", including "an astounding result" on the cohomology of moduli spaces, "foundational work on the moduli of metric graphs and tropical curves", and "beautiful new results on the expected number of turns in a random Young tableau".

She was named a Fellow of the American Mathematical Society, in the 2022 class of fellows, "for contributions to research at the interface of algebraic geometry and combinatorics, and to mentorship and mathematical exposition".
