= Number Theory Foundation =

Non-profit organization dedicated to number theory

The Number Theory Foundation (NTF) is a non-profit organization based in the United States which supports research and conferences in the field of number theory, with a particular focus on computational aspects and explicit methods.

The NTF funds the Selfridge prize awarded at each Algorithmic Number Theory Symposium (ANTS) and is a regular supporter of several conferences and organizations in number theory, including the Canadian Number Theory Association (CNTA), Women in Numbers (WIN), and the West Coast Number Theory (WCNT) conference.

== History ==
The NTF was created in 1999 via a grant from John Selfridge with an initial board of directors including Paul Bateman, John Brillhart, Richard Blecksmith, Brian Conrey, Ronald Graham, Richard Guy, Carl Pomerance, John Selfridge, Sam Wagstaff, and Hugh Williams. Carl Pomerance served as President of the foundation for its first two decades and was succeeded by Andrew Sutherland in 2019.
