= Florian Luca =

Romanian mathematician

Florian Luca (16 March 1969 – 28 July 2026) was a Romanian mathematician who specialized in number theory with emphasis on Diophantine equations, linear recurrences and the distribution of values of arithmetic functions. He made notable contributions to the proof that irrational automatic numbers are transcendental and the proof of a conjecture of Paul Erdős on the intersection of the Euler Totient function and the sum of divisors function.

Luca was born in Galați and graduated with a BS in Mathematics from Alexandru Ioan Cuza University in Iași (1992), and Ph.D. in Mathematics from the University of Alaska Fairbanks (1996). He held various appointments at Syracuse University, Bielefeld University, Czech Academy of Sciences, National Autonomous University of Mexico, the University of the Witwatersrand, and Stellenbosch University. He co-authored over 800 papers in mathematics with more than 350 co-authors.

He was a recipient of the award of a 2005 Guggenheim Fellowship for Natural Sciences, Latin America & Caribbean. In 2024 he received an ERC Synergy Grant and the next year he was awarded an honorary doctorate by the University of Debrecen.

He served as an editor-in-chief of Research in Number Theory and INTEGERS: the Electronic Journal of Combinatorial Number Theory, and an editor of the Fibonacci Quarterly.

== Selected works ==
- with Boris Adamczewski, Yann Bugeaud: Sur la complexité des nombres algébriques, Comptes Rendus Mathématique. Académie des Sciences. Paris 339 (1), 11-14, 2013
- with Kevin Ford, Carl Pomerance: Common values of the arithmetic functions Φ and σ, Bulletin of the London Mathematical Society 42 (3), 478-488, 2010
- with Jean-Marie De Koninck: Analytic Number Theory: Exploring the Anatomy of Integers, American Mathematical Society, 2012
- Diophantine Equations - Effective Methods for Diophantine Equations, 2009, Online pdf file
