= Samuel S. Wagstaff Jr. =

American mathematician (born 1945)

- Born: February 21, 1945 (age 81); New Bedford, Massachusetts
- Education: Cornell University and MIT
- Known for: Wagstaff prime
- Scientific career
- Fields: Mathematics; Computer science
- Workplaces: Purdue University; University of Georgia; University of Rochester; University of Illinois Urbana-Champaign

Samuel Standfield Wagstaff Jr. (born 21 February 1945) is an American mathematician and computer scientist, whose research interests are in the areas of cryptography, parallel computation, and analysis of algorithms, especially number theoretic algorithms. He is currently a professor of computer science and mathematics at Purdue University who coordinates the Cunningham project, a project to factor numbers of the form b^{n} ± 1, since 1983. He has authored/coauthored over 50 research papers and four books. He has an Erdős number of 1.

Wagstaff received his Bachelor of Science in 1966 from Massachusetts Institute of Technology. His doctoral dissertation was titled, On Infinite Matroids, PhD in 1970 from Cornell University.

Wagstaff was one of the founding faculty of Center for Education and Research in Information Assurance and Security (CERIAS) at Purdue, and its precursor, the Computer Operations, Audit, and Security Technology (COAST) Laboratory.

== Selected publications ==
- with John Brillhart, D. H. Lehmer, John L. Selfridge, Bryant Tuckerman: Factorization of b^{n} ± 1, b = 2,3,5,6,7,10,11,12 up to high powers, American Mathematical Society, 1983, 3rd edition 2002 as electronic book, Online text
- Samuel S. Wagstaff Jr. (2002). Mikhail J. Atallah (ed.). Cryptanalysis of Number Theoretic Ciphers. Computational Mathematics Series. CRC Press. ISBN 1-58488-153-4.
- Carlos J. Moreno; Samuel S. Wagstaff, Jr. (2005). Sums of Squares of Integers. CRC Press. ISBN 1-58488-456-8.
- Samuel S. Wagstaff Jr. (2013). The Joy of Factoring. Student Mathematical Library. American Mathematical Society. ISBN 978-1-4704-1048-3.
- Wagstaff The Cunningham Project, Fields Institute, pdf file
- Carl Pomerance; John L. Selfridge; Samuel S. Wagstaff, Jr. (July 1980). "The pseudoprimes to 25·10^{9}" (PDF). Mathematics of Computation. 35 (151): 1003–1026. doi:10.1090/S0025-5718-1980-0572872-7. JSTOR 2006210.
- Robert Baillie; Samuel S. Wagstaff, Jr. (October 1980). "Lucas Pseudoprimes" (PDF). Mathematics of Computation. 35 (152): 1391–1417. doi:10.1090/S0025-5718-1980-0583518-6. JSTOR 2006406. MR 0583518.
- Robert Baillie; Andrew Fiori; Samuel S. Wagstaff, Jr. (July 2021). "Strengthening the Baillie-PSW Primality Test" (PDF). Mathematics of Computation. 90 (330): 1931–1955. arXiv:2006.14425. doi:10.1090/mcom/3616. S2CID 220055722.
