= Sum of four cubes problem =

Asks whether each integer is a sum of four cubes

Unsolved problem in mathematics
Is every integer the sum of four perfect cubes?
More unsolved problems in mathematics

The sum of four cubes problem asks whether every integer is the sum of four cubes of integers. It is conjectured the answer is affirmative, but this conjecture has been neither proven nor disproven, at least as reported in 1982 by Philippe Revoy and again in 2004 by Henri Cohen. Some of the cubes may be negative numbers, in contrast to Waring's problem on sums of cubes, where they are required to be positive.

== Partial results ==
This question has been answered for some categories of integers, proving in each case that every integer in the category can be expressed as the sum of 4 cubes of integers. There are no known categories or specific numbers where this has been proven impossible.

=== Proof for most integers ===
In 1959, W. Sierpiński and A. Schinzel proved that all integers in the following categories may be expressed as the sum of 4 cubes of integers:

- integers congruent to 0 modulo 6
- integers congruent to 3 modulo 6
- integers congruent to 1 modulo 18
- integers congruent to 7 modulo 18
- integers congruent to 8 modulo 18

Sierpiński and Schinzel also provide an explanation of how the identities used in the proofs of these categories can be used to derive a complementary identity by replacing $x$ with $-x$ throughout the identity, which proves the opposite category as the original identity.

Taken together, this proved all integers except those congruent to ±2, ±4, and ±5 modulo 18 can be expressed as the sum of 4 cubes.

In addition, Sierpiński and Schinzel provided tables showing solutions for many specific integers in the range of 2 to 300, stating that these tables (in addition to the identities and methods earlier in the paper) together prove that all integers with absolute value less than or equal to 300, with the exceptions of ±148, ±257, and ±284, may be decomposed into the sum of 4 cubes.

In 2004, Henri Cohen provided a simpler summarization of these results, via the following identities (some of which are nearly identical to those used by Sierpiński and Schinzel):

$$\begin{align}
6x &= (x+1)^{3}+(x-1)^{3}-x^{3}-x^{3} \\
6x+3 &= x^3+(-x+4)^3+(2x-5)^3+(-2x+4)^3 \\
18x+1 &= (2x+14)^3+(-2x-23)^3+(-3x-26)^3+(3x+30)^3 \\
18x+7 &= (x+2)^3+(6x-1)^3+(8x-2)^3+(-9x+2)^3 \\
18x+8 &= (x-5)^3+(-x+14)^3+(-3x+29)^3+(3x-30)^3\ .
\end{align}$$

=== 18x±2 case ===
In 1966, V. A. Demjanenko provided the following identities:

$$\begin{align}
54x + 2 & = (29484x^{2} + 2211x + 43)^{3} + (-29484x^{2} - 2157x - 41)^{3} + (9828x^{2} + 485x + 4)^{3} + (-9828x^{2} - 971x - 22)^{3} \\
54x + 20 & = (3x - 11)^{3} + (-3x + 10)^{3} + (x + 2)^{3} + (-x + 7)^{3} \\
216x - 16 & = (14742x^{2} - 2157x + 82)^{3} + (-14742x^{2} + 2211x - 86)^{3} + (4914x^{2} - 971x + 44)^{3} + (-4914x^{2} + 485x - 8)^{3} \\
216x + 92 & = (3x - 164)^{3} + (-3x + 160)^{3} + (x - 35)^{3} + (-x + 71)^{3}
\end{align}$$

Together with their complementary identities, these prove the 18x±2 case with the exception of integers congruent to 108x±38. Demjanenko also proves the 108x±38 case in his paper using more advanced methods, thus completely proving the 18x±2 case.

By considering this result along with the earlier results from Sierpiński and Schinzel, only the 18x±4 and 18x±5 cases remain unproven, which can be expressed more simply as 9x±4.

Demjanenko also provides a table of decompositions of many specific numbers in the 9x±4 case, which he states expands on the work of Sierpiński and Schinzel to prove all integers with absolute value less than or equal to 1000 may be decomposed into the sum of 4 cubes.

== See also ==
- Sums of three cubes
