= Kristin Lauter =

American cryptographer (born 1969)

Kristin Estella Lauter
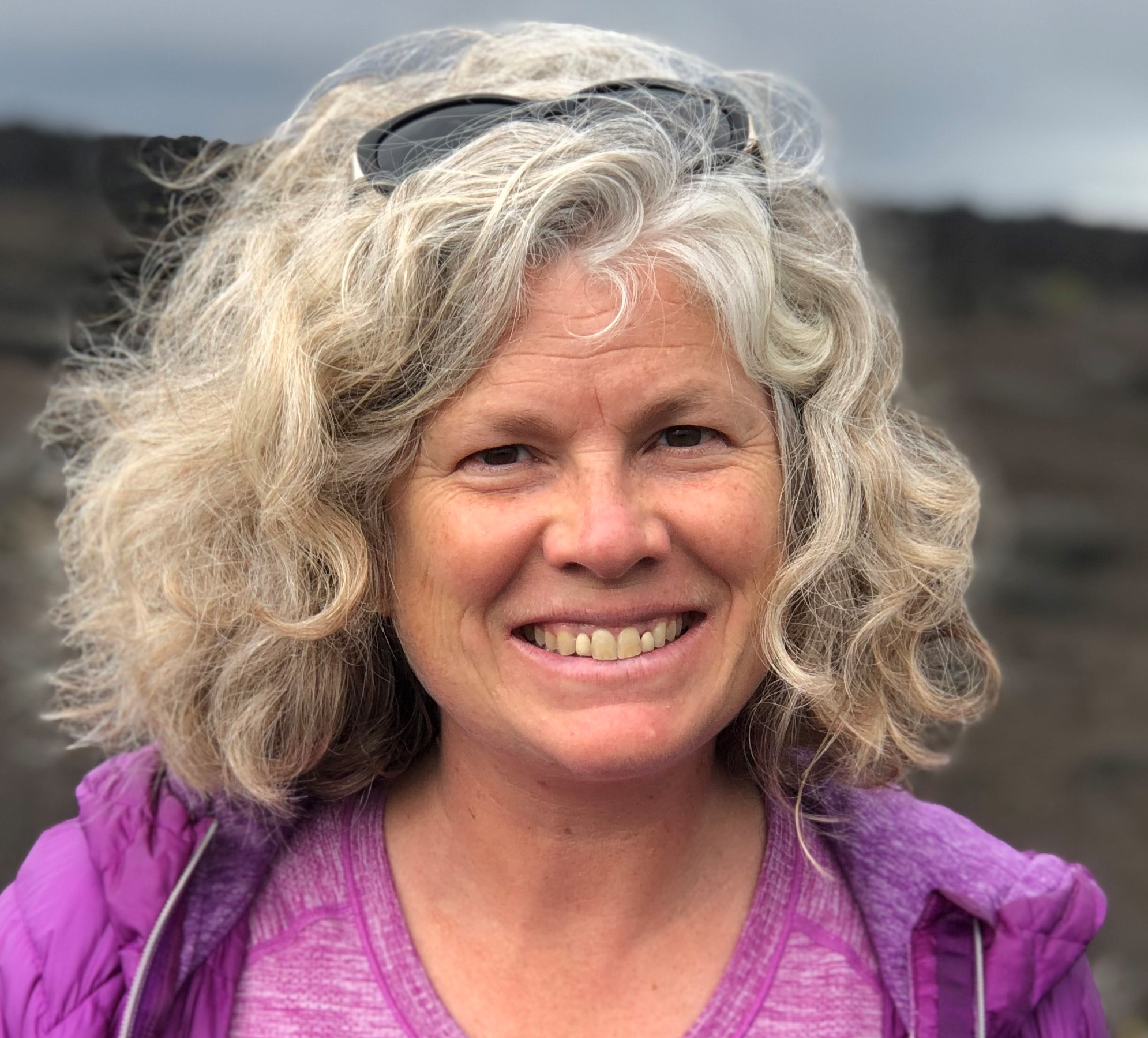
- Lauter in 2019
- Born: December 8, 1969 (age 56); Wisconsin
- Education: University of Chicago
- Known for: Elliptic curve cryptography
- Awards: Selfridge Prize (2008); Fellow, American Mathematical Society (2015); Fellow, Association for Women in Mathematics (2017); Fellow, Society for Industrial and Applied Mathematics (2020)
- Scientific career
- Fields: Mathematics, Cryptography
- Workplaces: Microsoft Research; Facebook AI Research
- Thesis: Ray class field constructions of curves over finite fields with many rational points (1996)
- Doctoral advisor: Niels Ovesen Nygaard

Kristin Estella Lauter (born 1969) is an American mathematician and cryptographer whose research interest is broadly in application of number theory and algebraic geometry in cryptography. She is particularly known for her work in the area of elliptic curve cryptography. She was a researcher at Microsoft Research in Redmond, Washington, from 1999–2021 and the head of the Cryptography Group from 2008–2021; her group developed Microsoft SEAL. In April 2021, Lauter joined Facebook AI Research (FAIR) as the West Coast Head of Research Science. She became the President-Elect of the Association for Women in Mathematics in February 2014 and served as President February 1, 2015 - January 31, 2017.

== Education and career ==
Lauter received her Bachelor of Arts, Master of Science, and Ph.D., all in mathematics, from the University of Chicago, in 1990, 1991, and 1996, respectively.

Prior to joining Microsoft, she held positions as a visiting scholar at Max Planck Institut fur Mathematik in Bonn, Germany (1997), T.H. Hildebrandt research assistant professor at the University of Michigan (1996-1999), and a visiting researcher at Institut de Mathematiques Luminy in France (1999).

In 1999, Lauter joined Microsoft to work on her research in cryptography. She has worked on developing new cryptographic systems, research on post quantum systems, and researching to find faults in current cryptographic systems.

In 2005, she worked with coworkers at Microsoft to develop a cryptographic algorithm from supersingular isogeny graphs. She created a HASH function from it and presented it at the NIST hash function competition.

Dr. Kristin Lauter is also known for her work in homomorphic encryption, which has been commonly used in machine-learning, building mathematical models, private AI, and the collection of genomic data. She has also worked on encryption with the Cloud. She has given many tutorials on homomorphic encryption for broad audiences. A specific tutorial on homomorphic encryption allowed her to meet some iDASH organizers to whom she explained her encryption techniques, such as edit distance and chi-squared statistics.

Beginning in April 2021, Lauter joined Facebook AI Research as West Coast Head of Research Science, leading the Seattle and Menlo Park Labs with groups in Core Machine Learning, Computer Vision, Robotics, Natural Language Processing, and other areas.

== Service ==
She is a co-founder of the Women in Numbers Network, a research collaboration community for women in number theory. The first conference was held in 2008 and it was called the WIN Conference. Groups of number theorists work on research and have published about 50 papers. She served on the Advisory Board of the Banff International Research Station and on the Council of the American Mathematical Society. She served as president of the Association for Women in Mathematics 2015–2017. From 2014 to 2016, Lauter served as a Council Member at Large for the American Mathematical Society. She currently is serving a second term on the board of trustees of the Mathematical Sciences Research Institute (MSRI); her terms on the MSRI Board run from 2018–2026.

== Recognition ==
Lauter and her coauthors were awarded the Selfridge Prize at ANTS VIII for their paper Computing Hilbert Class Polynomials. She was elected to the 2015 Class of Fellows of the American Mathematical Society "for contributions to arithmetic geometry and cryptography as well as service to the community."

In 2017, she was selected as a fellow of the Association for Women in Mathematics in the inaugural class.

She was chosen as the Pólya Lecturer for the Mathematical Association of America, lasting from 2018–2020.

In 2020 she was elected a fellow of the Society for Industrial and Applied Mathematics (SIAM) with the citation "Kristin E. Lauter, Microsoft Research, is being recognized for the development of practical cryptography and for leadership in the mathematical community."

In 2020, she was elected Fellow of the American Association for the Advancement of Science, in the Section on Mathematics.

In 2021, Lauter was elected as an honorary member of the Royal Spanish Mathematical Society. Real Sociedad Matemática Española (RSME), founded in 1911, is the oldest mathematical society of Spain.

In 2022 she was selected to be the SIAM Block Community Lecturer.
