= AWM–Microsoft Research Prize in Algebra and Number Theory =

Research honor for women

The AWM–Microsoft Research Prize in Algebra and Number Theory and is a prize given every other year by the Association for Women in Mathematics to an outstanding young female researcher in algebra or number theory. It was founded in 2012 by Microsoft Research and first issued in 2014.

== Winners ==
- Sophie Morel (2014), for her research in number theory, particularly her contributions to the Langlands program, an application of her results on weighted cohomology, and a new proof of Brenti's combinatorial formula for Kazhdan-Lusztig polynomials.
- Lauren Williams (2016), for her research in algebraic combinatorics, particularly her contributions on the totally nonnegative Grassmannian, her work on cluster algebras, and her proof (with Musiker and Schiffler) of the famous Laurent positivity conjecture.
- Melanie Wood (2018), for her research in number theory and algebraic geometry, particularly her contributions in arithmetic statistics and tropical geometry, as well as her work with Ravi Vakil on the limiting behavior of natural families of varieties.
- Melody Chan (2020), in recognition of her advances at the interface between algebraic geometry and combinatorics.
- Jennifer Balakrishnan (2022), in recognition of her advances in computing rational points on algebraic curves over number fields.
- Yunqing Tang (2024), for "work in arithmetic geometry, including results on the Grothendieck–Katz $p$-curvature conjecture, a conjecture of Ogus on algebraicity of cycles, arithmetic intersection theory, and the unbounded denominators conjecture of Atkin and Swinnerton-Dyer"

== See also ==
- List of awards honoring women
- List of mathematics awards
