= Sophie Morel =

French mathematician (born 1979)

- Born: 1979 (age 46–47)
- Education: École Normale Supérieure; Université Paris-Sud
- Awards: EMS Prize (2012); AWM-Microsoft Research Prize (2014)
- Scientific career
- Fields: Mathematics
- Workplaces: École Normale Supérieure de Lyon; Princeton University; Harvard University
- Doctoral advisor: Gérard Laumon

Sophie Morel (born 1979) is a French mathematician, specializing in number theory. She is a CNRS directrice de recherches in mathematics at École normale supérieure de Lyon. In 2012 she received one of the ten prizes of the European Mathematical Society.

== Biography ==
In a 2011 interview, Morel credited a math magazine bought while in 9th grade as well as summer camps for developing her interest in mathematics and in a 2012 interview she mentioned being a keen distance runner. She studied in Paris at the École Normale Supérieure. In 2005 she finished her Ph.D. at the University of Paris-Sud, under the supervision of Gérard Laumon. Her thesis made progress on the Langlands program.

After her Ph.D., she was a Clay Research Fellow between 2005 and 2011. In December 2009 she was appointed as a professor of mathematics at Harvard University, becoming the first woman in mathematics to be tenured there. From 2012 to 2020, she was a professor of mathematics in Princeton University, where she was also the Henry Burchard Fine Professor in 2015. Morel moved to the École Normale supérieure de Lyon as a CNRS directrice de recherches in mathematics in 2020.

== Recognition ==
She gave an invited talk at the International Congress of Mathematicians in 2010, in the "Number Theory" section. In 2012 she received one of the prestigious European Mathematical Society Prize for young researchers, and in May 2013 she was announced as the winner of the inaugural 2014 AWM-Microsoft Research Prize in Algebra and Number Theory.

== Selected publications ==
- Morel, Sophie (2006). "Complexes pondérés sur les compactifications de Baily-Borel: Le cas des variétés de Siegel". Journal of the American Mathematical Society. 21 (1): 23–61. doi:10.1090/S0894-0347-06-00538-8.
- Morel, Sophie (2010). On the Cohomology of Certain Non-Compact Shimura Varieties. Annals of Mathematics Studies. Vol. 173. Princeton University Press. ISBN 978-1400835393.
- Morel, Sophie (2011). "Cohomologie d'intersection des variétés modulaires de Siegel, suite". Compositio Mathematica. 147 (6): 1671–1740. arXiv:1806.09910. doi:10.1112/S0010437X11005409. ISSN 0010-437X.
- Morel, Sophie; Suh, Junecue (2019). "The standard sign conjecture on algebraic cycles: The case of Shimura varieties". Journal für die reine und angewandte Mathematik (Crelle's Journal). 2019 (748): 139–151. arXiv:1408.0461. doi:10.1515/crelle-2016-0048. ISSN 0075-4102.
