= CERIAS =

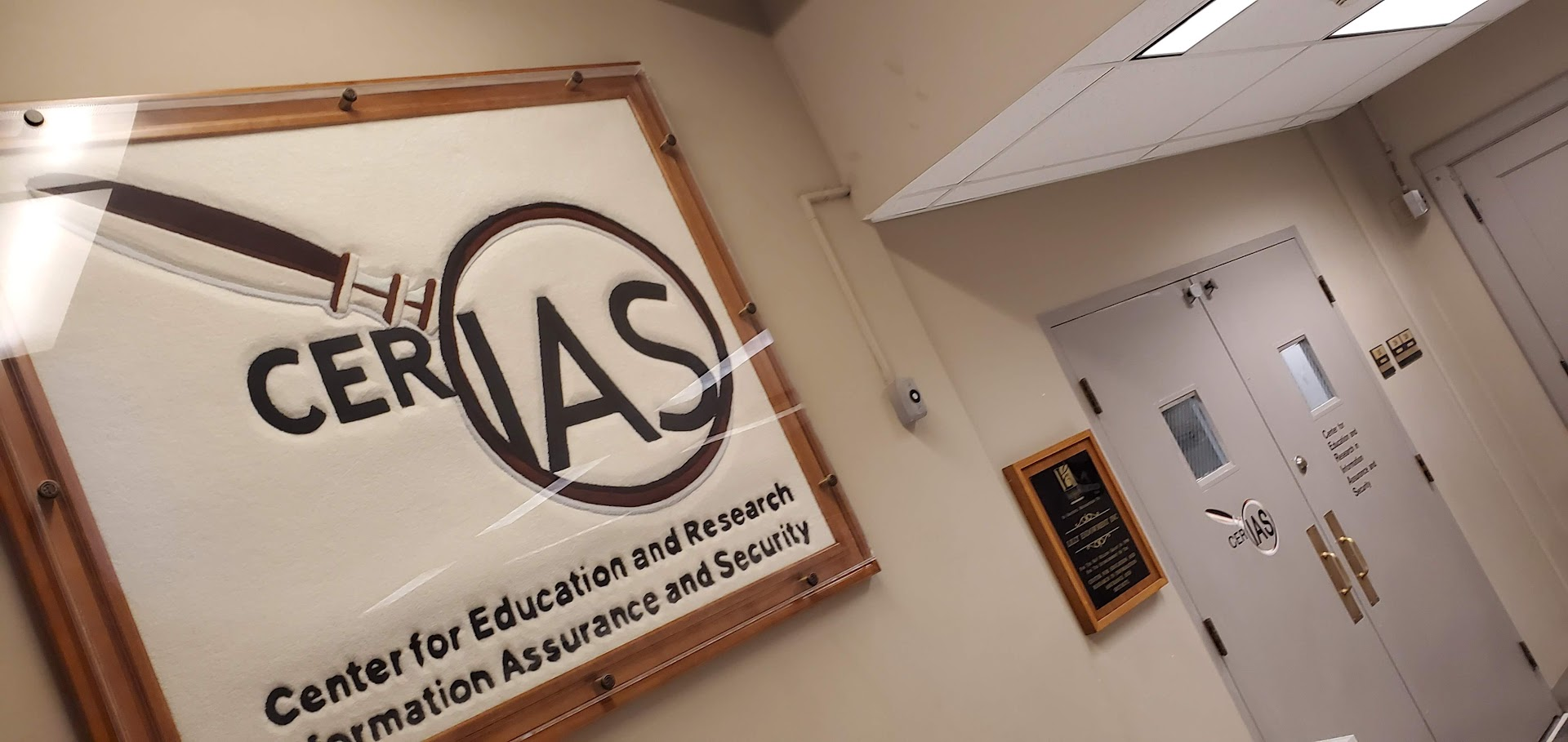
- Motto: "CERIAS advances the knowledge and practice of information assurance, security, and privacy through discovery, education, and engagement."
- Field of research: Information Assurance and Security
- Director: Dongyan Xu
- Faculty: Eugene Spafford
- Address: 101 Foundry Dr.
- Location: West Lafayette, Indiana, United States
- ZIP code: 47906
- Campus: West Lafayette
- Website: cerias.purdue.edu

The Center for Education and Research in Information Assurance and Security (CERIAS) of Purdue University, United States, is a center for research and education in areas of information security for computing and communication infrastructures.

Its research is focused on the following areas:

- Risk management, policies, and laws
- Trusted social and human interactions
- Security awareness, education, and training
- Assurable software and architectures
- Enclave and network security
- Incident detection, response, and investigation
- Identification, authentication, and privacy
- Cryptology and rights

CERIAS is one of the world’s leading academic institutions in this area. It is one of the NSF's "Original Seven" Centers for Academic Excellence in Information Assurance Education.

== History ==
CERIAS was rooted in COAST research group (Computer Operations, Audit, and Security Technology) established in 1991 in the Computer Sciences Department of Purdue out of research groups of professors Eugene Spafford and Samuel Wagstaff, Jr. COAST was initially funded by Sun Microsystems, Schlumberger, Bell Northern Research (BNR, now NorTel), and Hughes Research Laboratories. COAST was subsumed by CERIAS on January 1, 1999.

== See also ==
- Carnegie Mellon's CyLab
- Massachusetts Institute of Technology's Computer Science and Artificial Intelligence Lab
