= Kiran Kedlaya =

American mathematician (born 1974)

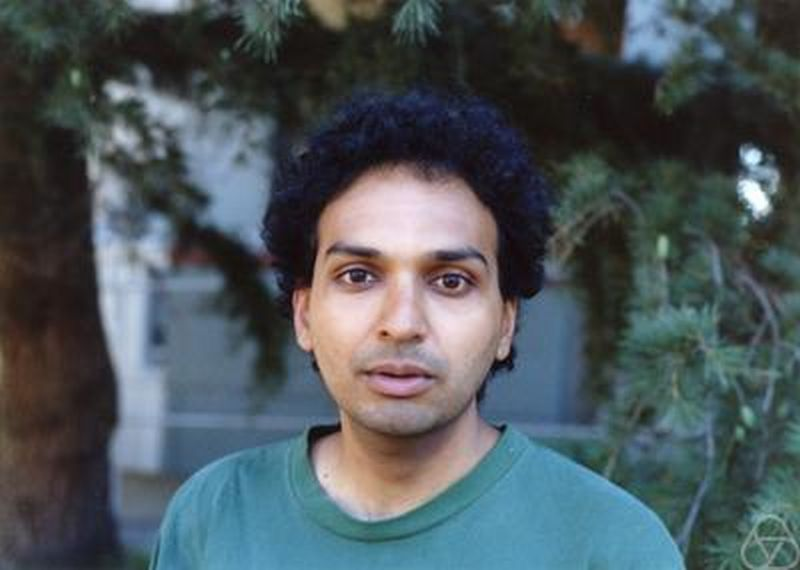
- Born: June 1974 (age 52); United States
- Education: MIT (Ph.D. 2000); Princeton (M.A. 1997); Harvard (B.A. 1996)
- Awards: Presidential Early Career Award for Scientists and Engineers (2006); Fellow, American Mathematical Society (2012)
- Scientific career
- Fields: Mathematics
- Workplaces: UCSD; MIT
- Doctoral advisor: Aise Johan de Jong
- Doctoral students: Jennifer Balakrishnan
- Website: kskedlaya.org

Kiran Sridhara Kedlaya (/ˈkɪrən ˈʃriːdər kɛdˈlɑːjə/ KIRR-ən SHREE-dər ked-LAH-yə; born July 1974) is an American mathematician. He currently is a professor of mathematics and the Stefan E. Warschawski chair in mathematics at the University of California, San Diego.

== Biography ==
Kiran Kedlaya was born into a Tulu Brahmin family. At age 16, Kedlaya won a gold medal at the International Mathematics Olympiad, which he later followed with a silver and another gold medal. While an undergraduate student at Harvard, Kedlaya was a three-time Putnam Fellow in 1993, 1994, and 1995. A 1996 article by The Harvard Crimson described him as "the best college-age student in math in the United States".

Kedlaya was runner-up for the 1995 Morgan Prize, for a paper in which he substantially improved on results of László Babai and Vera Sós (1985) on the size of the largest product-free subset of a finite group of order n.

Kedlaya gave an invited talk at the International Congress of Mathematicians in 2010, on the topic of "Number Theory". In 2012, he became a fellow of the American Mathematical Society.

== Game shows ==
Kedlaya was a contestant on the game show Jeopardy! in 2011, winning one episode.

== Selected works ==
- p-adic Differential Equations, Cambridge Studies in Advanced Mathematics, Band 125, Cambridge University Press 2010
- with David Savitt, Dinesh Thakur, Matt Baker, Brian Conrad, Samit Dasgupta, Jeremy Teitelbaum p-adic Geometry, Lectures from the 2007 Arizona Winter School, American Mathematical Society 2008
- with Bjorn Poonen, Ravi Vakil The William Lowell Putnam Mathematical Competition 1985-2000: Problems, Solutions and Commentary, Mathematical Association of America, 2002
