= Research in Number Theory =

- Discipline: Mathematics
- Language: English
- Edited by: Jennifer Balakrishnan; Florian Luca; Ken Ono; Andrew Sutherland

Publication details
- History: 2015–present
- Publisher: Springer Science+Business Media
- Frequency: Quarterly
- Open access: Hybrid

Standard abbreviations
- ISO 4: Res. Number Theory

Indexing
- ISSN: 2522-0160 (print); 2363-9555 (web)
- LCCN: 2018242061
- OCLC no.: 947098820

Links
- Journal homepage; Online archive

Research in Number Theory is a peer-reviewed mathematics journal covering number theory and arithmetic geometry. The editors-in-chief are Jennifer Balakrishnan (Boston University), Florian Luca (University of Witwatersrand), Ken Ono (University of Virginia), and Andrew Sutherland (Massachusetts Institute of Technology). It was established in 2015 as a full open access journal, but is now a hybrid open access journal, published by Springer Science+Business Media.

== Abstracting and indexing ==
The journal is abstracted and indexed in EBSCO databases, Emerging Sources Citation Index, MathSciNet, Scopus, and Zentralblatt MATH.
