= John Brillhart =

American mathematician (1930–2022)

- Born: John David Brillhart; November 13, 1930; Berkeley, California
- Died: May 21, 2022 (aged 91)
- Education: University of California
- Known for: Continued fraction factorization
- Scientific career
- Fields: Mathematics
- Workplaces: University of Arizona
- Doctoral advisor: D. H. Lehmer

John David Brillhart (November 13, 1930 – May 21, 2022) was a mathematician who worked in number theory at the University of Arizona.

== Early life and education ==
Brillhart was born on November 13, 1930, in Berkeley, California.

He studied at the University of California, Berkeley, where he received his A.B. in 1953, his M.A. in 1966, and his Ph.D. in 1967. His doctoral thesis in mathematics was supervised by D. H. Lehmer, with assistance from Leonard Carlitz.

Before becoming a mathematician, he served in the United States Army.

== Career ==
Brillhart joined the faculty at the University of Arizona in 1967 and retired in 2001. He advised two Ph.D. students.

== Research ==
Brillart worked in integer factorization. His joint work with Michael A. Morrison in 1975 describes how to implement the continued fraction factorization method originally developed by Lehmer and Ralph Ernest Powers in 1931. One consequence was the first factorization of the Fermat number $F^7 = 2^{2^7}+1$. Their ideas were influential in the development of the quadratic sieve by Carl Pomerance.

Brillhart was a member of the Cunningham Project, which factors Mersenne, Fermat, and related numbers. He was also a founding member and financial contributor to the Number Theory Foundation started by John L. Selfridge.
