= Verner Emil Hoggatt Jr. =

American mathematician

- Born: June 26, 1921
- Died: August 11, 1980 (aged 59)
- Education: Oregon State University (Ph.D.)
- Occupation: mathematician
- Known for: Fibonacci numbers, number theory
- Notable work: The Inverse Weierstrass P-Function

Verner Emil Hoggatt Jr. (June 26, 1921 – August 11, 1980) was an American mathematician, known mostly for his work in Fibonacci numbers and number theory.

Hoggatt received a Ph.D. from Oregon State University in 1955 for his dissertation on the inverse Weierstrass ℘ function. Besides his contributions in Fibonacci numbers and number theory it is as the co-founder of the Fibonacci Association and publisher of the associated journal Fibonacci Quarterly for which he is best remembered.

Howard Eves commented, "During his long and outstanding tenure at San Jose State University, Vern directed an enormous number of master's theses, and put out an amazing number of attractive papers... He became the authority on Fibonacci and related numbers."

== See also ==
- Fibonacci numbers
- The Fibonacci Association
- Alfred Brousseau
