= Rio Castle =

Castle in Rio, Greece

- κάστρο του Ρίου
- Rio, Western Greece
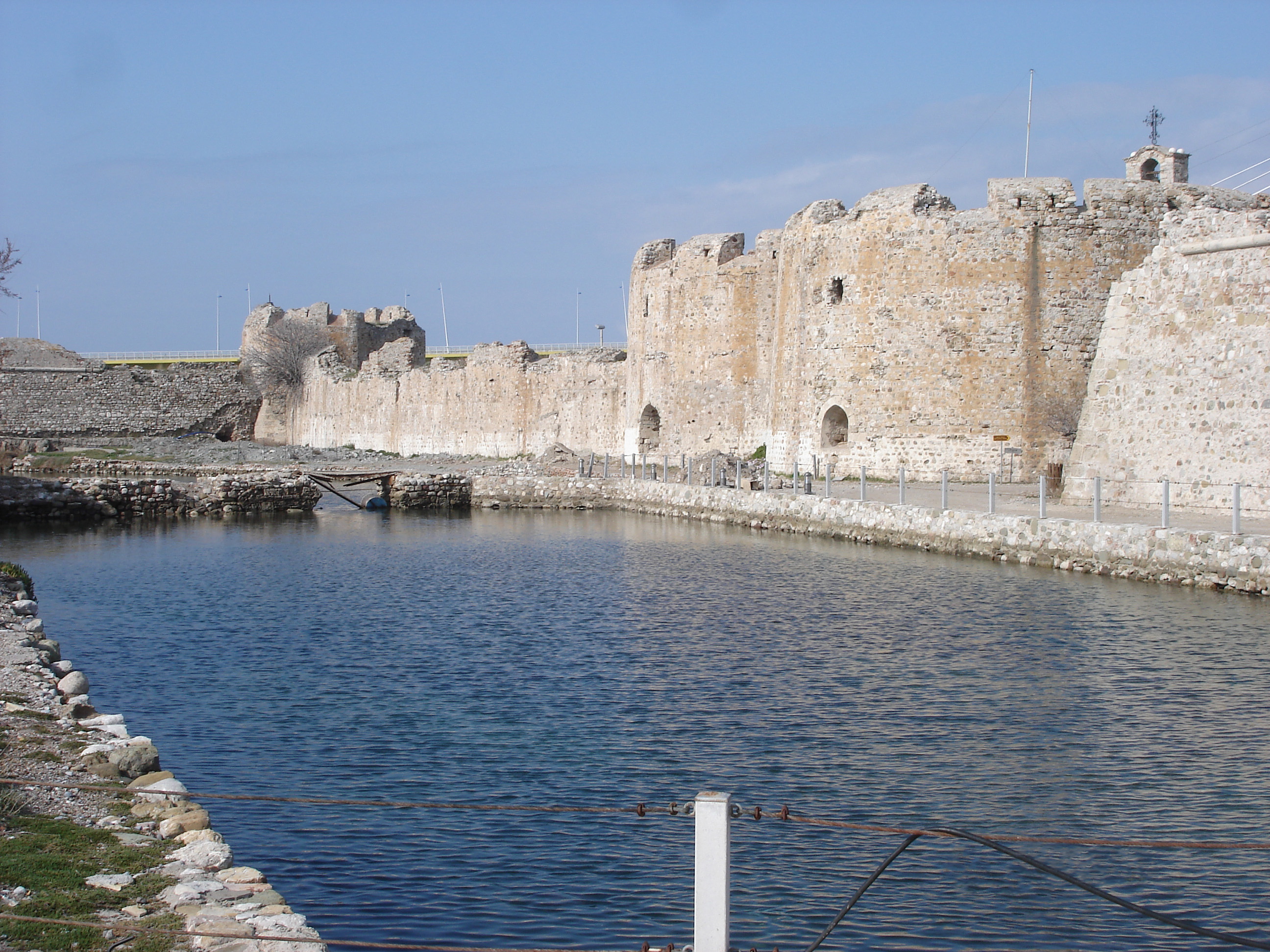
- The landwards gate and its ditch (2008)

Site information
- Type: citadel
- Owner: Greek Ministry of Culture
- Controlled by: Ottoman Empire 1499–1687; Republic of Genoa 1533; Republic of Venice 1687-1715; Ottoman Empire 1715-1823
- Open to the public: Yes
- Condition: ruin

Location
- Coordinates: 38.3114°N 21.7812°E

Site history
- Built by: Ottoman Empire
- In use: until 1912
- Materials: hewn stone (ashlar)

The Rio Castle (Greek: κάστρο του Ρίου), historically known as the Castle of the Morea (Italian: Castello de Morea) in opposition to its counterpart, the Castle of Rumelia at Antirrio, is located at the north tip of the Rio peninsula in Achaea, Greece, at the entrance of the Corinthian Gulf. The Rio-Antirio Bridge is located next to it, and the local ferry docks lie on either side. Today it is used for cultural purposes, especially concerts and is a tourist attraction.

The castle was built by the Ottoman Sultan Bayezid II in 1499 above the ruins of an ancient temple of Poseidon, within three months. Along with its twin, the Antirrio Castle, they were intended to protect the entrance to the Corinthian Gulf, and were nicknamed the "Little Dardanelles". The castle is located on the sea shore, with its northern side protected by the sea and the southern by a broad moat, filled with sea water, and two outer bastions (ravelins), linked to the main fort by stone bridges. It has two gates, the central one, facing landwards, and the sea gate.

In 1533, it was briefly captured by the Genoese under Andrea Doria, but the Ottomans recaptured it later in the year. In 1687, during the Morean War, it was taken by the Venetians under Francesco Morosini. The Venetians rebuilt the castle, restoring and strengthening it by the addition of towers, giving it its final shape. The Venetians also added the small chapel of the Life-giving Spring (Zoodochos Pege). The Ottomans retook it in 1715, and remained until they surrendered it to French General Nicolas Joseph Maison. Between 1831 and 1912, the castle was used as a military and then civilian prison, whose inmates were often used by the municipality of Patras for cleaning the streets of Rio.

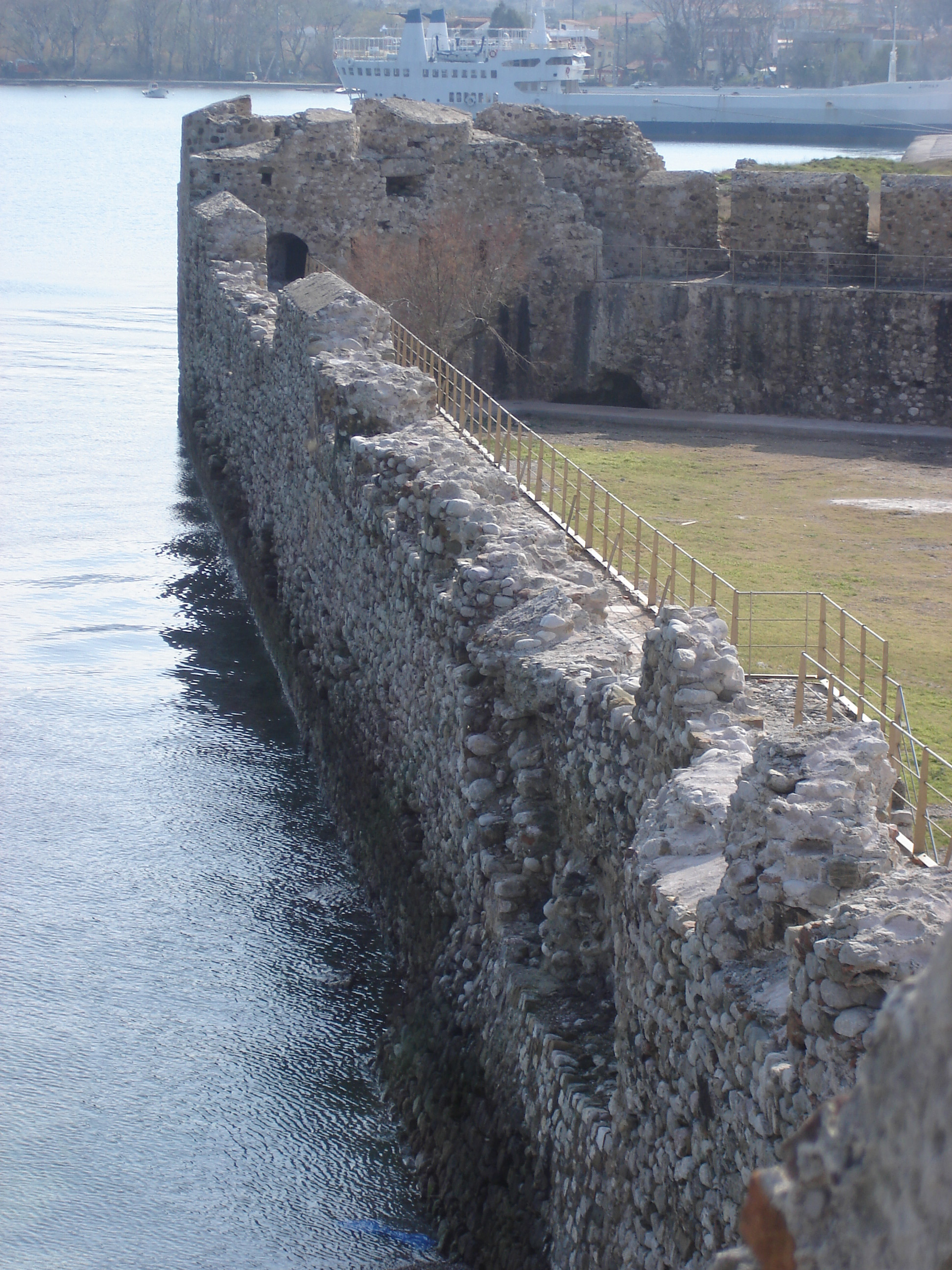
The Ottoman-built sea wall

== See also ==
- Bayezid II
