= Andrew Sutherland (mathematician) =

American mathematician

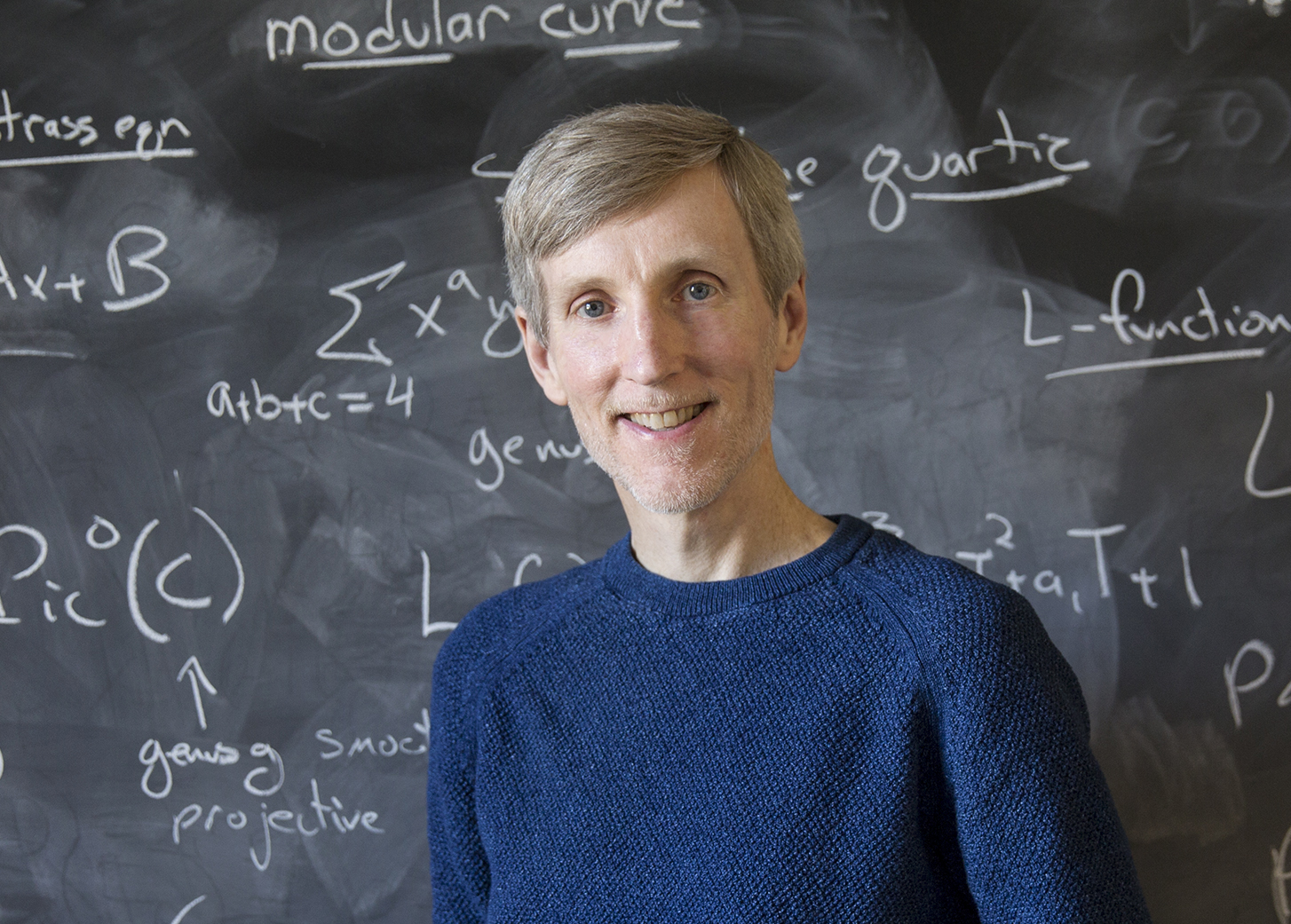
- Andrew Sutherland at MIT in 2016
- Education: MIT
- Awards: Fellow, American Mathematical Society (2021); Selfridge Prize (2012)
- Scientific career
- Fields: Mathematics
- Workplaces: MIT
- Thesis: Order computations in generic groups (2007)
- Doctoral advisor: Michael Sipser
- Website: math.mit.edu/~drew

Andrew Victor Sutherland is an American mathematician and Senior Research Scientist at the Massachusetts Institute of Technology. His research focuses on computational aspects of number theory and arithmetic geometry. He is known for his contributions to several projects involving large scale computations, including the Polymath project on bounded gaps between primes, the L-functions and Modular Forms Database, the sums of three cubes project, and the computation and classification of Sato-Tate distributions.

== Education and career ==
Sutherland earned a bachelor's degree in mathematics from MIT in 1990. Following an entrepreneurial career in the software industry he returned to MIT and completed his doctoral degree in mathematics in 2007 under the supervision of Michael Sipser and Ronald Rivest, winning the George M. Sprowls prize for his thesis. He joined the MIT mathematics department as a research scientist in 2009. He was promoted to principal research scientist in 2012, and then to senior research scientist in 2024.

He is one of the principal investigators in the Simons Collaboration on Arithmetic Geometry, Number Theory, and Computation, a large multi-university collaboration involving Boston University, Brown, Harvard, MIT, and Dartmouth College, and he currently serves as an associate editor of Mathematics of Computation, editor in chief of Research in Number Theory, managing editor of the L-functions and Modular Forms Database, and president of the Number Theory Foundation.

== Contributions ==
Sutherland has developed or improved several methods for counting points on elliptic curves and hyperelliptic curves, that have applications to elliptic curve cryptography, hyperelliptic curve cryptography, elliptic curve primality proving, and the computation of L-functions. These include improvements to the Schoof–Elkies–Atkin algorithm that led to new point-counting records, and average polynomial-time algorithms for computing zeta functions of hyperelliptic curves over finite fields, developed jointly with David Harvey.

Much of Sutherland's research involves the application of fast point-counting algorithms to numerically investigate generalizations of the Sato-Tate conjecture regarding the distribution of point counts for a curve (or abelian variety) defined over the rational numbers (or a number field) when reduced modulo prime numbers of increasing size.. It is conjectured that these distributions can be described by random matrix models using a "Sato-Tate group" associated to the curve by a construction of Serre. In 2012 Francesc Fite, Kiran Kedlaya, Victor Rotger and Sutherland classified the Sato-Tate groups that arise for genus 2 curves and abelian varieties of dimension 2, and in 2019 Fite, Kedlaya, and Sutherland announced a similar classification to abelian varieties of dimension 3.

In the process of studying these classifications, Sutherland compiled several large data sets of curves and then worked with Andrew Booker and others to compute their L-functions and incorporate them into the L-functions and Modular Forms Database. More recently, Booker and Sutherland resolved Mordell's question regarding the representation of 3 as a sum of three cubes.

== Recognition ==
Sutherland was named to the 2021 class of fellows of the American Mathematical Society "for contributions to number theory, both on the theoretical and computational aspects of the subject". He was selected to deliver the Arf Lecture in 2022. and the Beeger Lecture in 2024.

== Selected publications ==
- Sutherland, Andrew V. (2011). "Computing Hilbert class polynomials with the Chinese remainder theorem". Mathematics of Computation. 80 (273): 501–538. arXiv:0903.2785. doi:10.1090/S0025-5718-2010-02373-7. MR 2728992.
- Fité, Francesc; Kedlaya, Kiran; Sutherland, Andrew V; Rotger, Victor (2012). "Sato-Tate distributions and Galois endomorphism modules in genus 2". Compositio Mathematica. 149 (5): 1390–1442. arXiv:1110.6638. doi:10.1112/S0010437X12000279. MR 2982436.
- Sutherland, Andrew V. (2013). "Isogeny volcanoes". Proceedings of the Tenth Algorithmic Number Theory Symposium (ANTS X). Vol. 1. Mathematical Sciences Publishers. pp. 507–530. arXiv:1208.5370. doi:10.2140/obs.2013.1.507. MR 3207429.
- Sutherland, Andrew V. (2016). "Computing images of Galois representations attached to elliptic curves". Forum of Mathematics, Sigma. 4: 79. arXiv:1504.07618. doi:10.1017/fms.2015.33. MR 3482279.
- Sutherland, Andrew V. (2019). "Sato-Tate distributions". Analytic methods in arithmetic geometry. Contemporary Mathematics. Vol. 740. American Mathematical Society. pp. 197–258. arXiv:1604.01256. doi:10.1090/conm/740/14904. MR 4033732.
