= Alfred Brousseau =

American mathematician

Brother Alfred Brousseau, F.S.C. (February 17, 1907 – May 31, 1988), was an educator, photographer and mathematician and was known mostly as a founder of the Fibonacci Association and as an educator.

== Biography ==
Brother Alfred Brousseau was born in North Beach, San Francisco, as one of six children. On August 14, 1920, Brousseau entered the juniorate of the De La Salle Christian Brothers (Brothers of the Christian Schools), a religious institute of teachers in the Roman Catholic Church. He was accepted into the Christian Brothers novitiate on 31 July 1923 and advanced to the scholasticate on the campus of St. Mary's College in 1924.

== Academic career ==
In 1926, while still a college student, Brousseau began teaching at Sacred Heart High School in San Francisco, California. He continued teaching at the secondary level until 1930 when he was assigned to teach at St. Mary's College while subsequently pursuing a doctorate in physics from the University of California, Berkeley, in 1937. In 1941 Brousseau was appointed principal of Sacred Heart High School in San Francisco, and later was appointed provincial of the Christian Brothers of the District of California. He returned to St. Mary's College in 1959 and became chair of the School of Science. Between this period and 1978, Alfred served both president and treasurer of the Northern Section of the California Mathematics Council and later as president of the entire State Council.

In 1963, with the American mathematician Verner E. Hoggatt, Brousseau founded the Fibonacci Association with the intention of promoting research into the Fibonacci numbers and related fields. In 1969 Brousseau commented on the Fibonacci Association (and its associated journal, the Fibonacci Quarterly) in the April edition of Time magazine, "We got a group of people together in 1963, and just like a bunch of nuts, we started a mathematics magazine ... [People] tend to find an esthetic satisfaction in it. They think that there's some kind of mystical connection between these numbers and the universe."

== Photography ==
Brousseau was a keen photographer and amassed a collection of in excess of 20,000 color 35 mm transparencies recording the native flora of California.
