= Carole Lacampagne =

American mathematician

- Born: 12 September 1933
- Died: 5 August 2021 (aged 87)
- Citizenship: United States
- Education: Teachers College, Columbia University
- Known for: Mathematics Education
- Awards: Fellow of the American Mathematical Society
- Scientific career
- Fields: Mathematics, Mathematics education
- Workplaces: George Washington University
- Thesis: An evaluation of the Women and Mathematics (WAM) program and associated sex-related differences in the teaching, learning, and counseling of mathematics (1979)

Carole Baker Lacampagne (12 September 1933 – 5 August 2021) was an American mathematician. She is known for her work in mathematics education and gender equality.

== Career ==
Lacampagne received her Ed.D. from Teachers College, Columbia University in 1979. She then worked at Northern Illinois University and the National Science Foundation before moving to the Department of Education in 1991, becoming Director of the National Institute on Postsecondary Education, Libraries, and Lifelong Learning (PLLI). She then became Director of the Mathematical Sciences Education Board at the National Academies of Science before her partial retirement as an adjunct at George Washington University.

== Work for gender equality ==
Lacampagne was actively involved in supporting women in mathematics, and became head of the Women and Mathematic's program of the Mathematical Association of America. She wrote about women and mathematics throughout her career, including her 1979 dissertation.

== Awards and honors ==
In 2012, Lacampagne became a fellow of the American Mathematical Society.

== Selected publications ==
- Lacampagne, Carole B., et al. "Gender equity in mathematics." Handbook for achieving gender equity through education (2007): 235–253.
- Lacampagne, Carole B. State of the Art: Transforming Ideas for Teaching and Learning Mathematics. US Dept. of Education, OERI Education Information, 555 New Jersey Avenue, NW, Washington, DC 20208-5641
