= Andrew Booker (mathematician) =

British mathematician (born 1976)

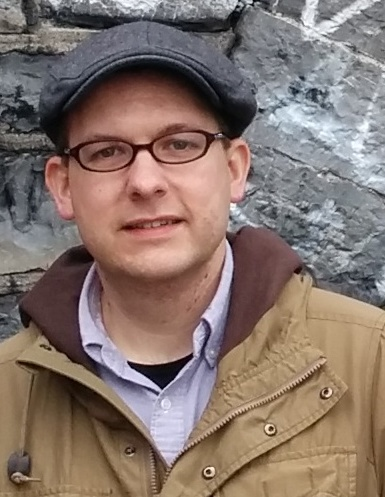
- Born: 1976 (age 49–50)
- Education: University of Virginia; Princeton University
- Scientific career
- Fields: Mathematics
- Workplaces: University of Bristol
- Thesis: Numerical Tests of Modularity (2003)
- Doctoral advisor: Peter Sarnak

Andrew Richard Booker (born 1976) is a British mathematician who is currently Professor of Pure Mathematics at the University of Bristol. He is an analytic number theorist known for his work on L-functions of automorphic forms and his contributions to the sums of three cubes problem.

== Education ==
Booker graduated from the University of Virginia in 1998, earning the E. J. McShane Prize as the top undergraduate in mathematics. He completed his doctoral degree at Princeton University in 2003, under the supervision of Peter Sarnak.

== Contributions ==
In the spring of 2019 Booker gained international attention by showing that 33 can be expressed as the sum of three cubes. At that time 33 and 42 were the only numbers less than 100 for which this problem was open. Later that year, in joint work with Andrew Sutherland of MIT, he settled the case of 42, as well as answering a 65-year-old question of Mordell by finding a third representation for 3 as the sum of three cubes. Popular Mechanics cited the result for 42 as one of the top two mathematical breakthroughs of 2019.

== Video appearances ==
Numberphile has produced three YouTube videos related to sums of three cubes in which Andrew Booker is the featured guest:

- 42 is the new 33
- The Mystery of 42 is Solved
- 3 as a sum of 3 cubes

As of January 2023 these videos had accumulated a total of almost two million views.

== Selected publications ==
- Booker, Andrew R. (2003). "Poles of Artin L-functions and the strong Artin conjecture". Annals of Mathematics. 158 (3): 1089–1098. doi:10.4007/annals.2003.158.1089. MR 2031863. Zbl 1081.11038.
- Booker, Andrew R.; Strömbergsson, Andreas; Venkatesh, Akshay (2006). "Effective computation of Maass cusp forms". International Mathematics Research Notices. 2006 71281. doi:10.1155/IMRN/2006/71281. MR 2249995. Zbl 1154.11018.
- Booker, Andrew R. (2019). "Cracking the problem with 33". Research in Number Theory. 5 (3) 26. arXiv:1903.04284. doi:10.1007/s40993-019-0162-1. ISSN 2522-0160.
