= Fibonacci Quarterly =

- Discipline: Mathematics
- Language: English
- Edited by: Curtis Cooper

Publication details
- History: 1963–present
- Publisher: Fibonacci Association (United States)
- Frequency: Quarterly
- Open access: Delayed

Standard abbreviations
- ISO 4: Fibonacci Q.
- MathSciNet: Fibonacci Quart.

Indexing
- ISSN: 0015-0517
- LCCN: 68126420

Links
- Journal homepage; Online archive

The Fibonacci Quarterly is a scientific journal on mathematical topics related to the Fibonacci numbers, published four times per year. It is the primary publication of The Fibonacci Association, which has published it since 1963. Its founding editors were Verner Emil Hoggatt Jr. and Alfred Brousseau; the present editor is Professor Curtis Cooper of the Mathematics Department of the University of Central Missouri.

The Fibonacci Quarterly has an editorial board of nineteen members and is overseen by the nine-member board of directors of The Fibonacci Association. The journal includes research articles, expository articles, Elementary Problems and Solutions, Advanced Problems and Solutions, and announcements of interest to members of The Fibonacci Association. Occasionally, the journal publishes special invited articles by distinguished mathematicians.

An online Index to The Fibonacci Quarterly covering Volumes 1-55 (1963–2017) includes a Title Index, Author Index, Elementary Problem Index, Advanced Problem Index, Miscellaneous Problem Index, and Quick Reference Keyword Index. The Fibonacci Quarterly is available online to subscribers; on December 31, 2017, online volumes ranged from the current issue back to volume 1 (1963).

Many articles in The Fibonacci Quarterly deal directly with topics that are very closely related to Fibonacci numbers, such as Lucas numbers, the golden ratio, Zeckendorf representations, Binet forms, Fibonacci polynomials, and Chebyshev polynomials. However, many other topics, especially as related to recurrences, are also well represented. These include primes, pseudoprimes, graph colorings, Euler numbers, continued fractions, Stirling numbers, Pythagorean triples, Ramsey theory, Lucas-Bernoulli numbers, quadratic residues, higher-order recurrence sequences, nonlinear recurrence sequences, combinatorial proofs of number-theoretic identities, Diophantine equations, special matrices and determinants, the Collatz sequence, public-key crypto functions, elliptic curves, fractal dimension, hypergeometric functions, Fibonacci polytopes, geometry, graph theory, music, and art.
