= Václav Šimerka =

Bohemian mathematician (1819–1887)

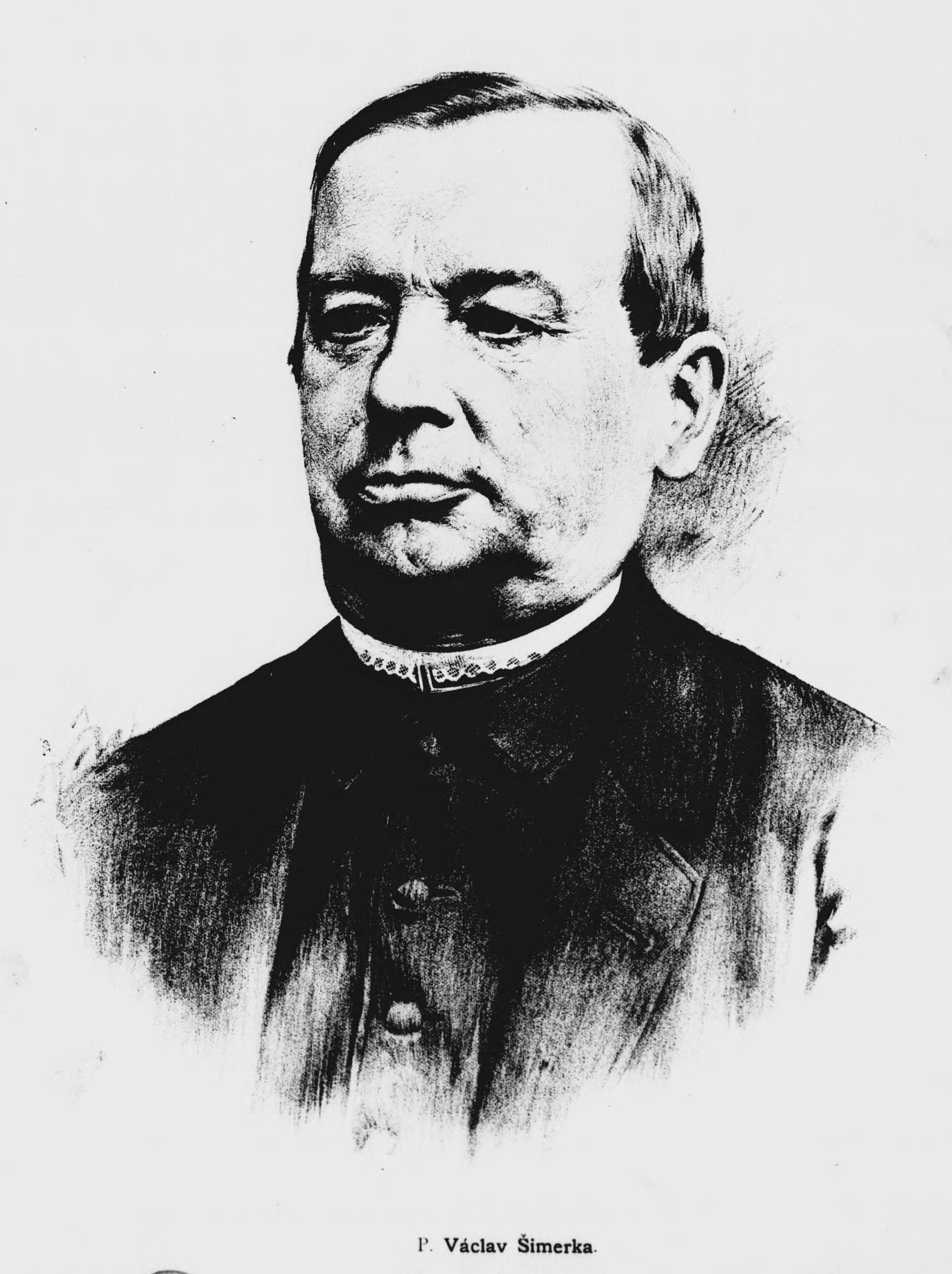
- Born: 20 December 1818; Vysoké Veselí, Bohemia, Austrian Empire
- Died: 26 December 1887 (aged 69); Praskačka, Bohemia, Austria-Hungary
- Known for: discovering the first seven Carmichael numbers
- Scientific career
- Fields: Mathematics

Václav Šimerka (20 December 1819 – 26 December 1887) was a Czech mathematician, priest, physicist and philosopher. He wrote the first Czech text on calculus and is credited for discovering the first seven Carmichael numbers in 1885.

== Biography ==
Šimerka was born on 20 December 1819 in Vysoké Veselí in Bohemia to a family of coopers of businessman Petr Šimerka and his wife Terezie. After attending school in Jičín, he studied in the University of Prague's Faculty of Philosophy from 1839 to 1841. There, he studied mathematics under Jakob Philipp Kulik and astronomy under and practical geometry under Adam Bittner and also obligatory teaching of religion, philosophy, mathematics, Latin philology, natural science, physics, moral philosophy and history. After graduating in Prague, Šimerka studied in the Theological Seminary in Hradec Králové. Šimerka was ordained on 25 July 1845 and then became a chaplain in Žlunice near Jičín. He only spent a short time being a chaplain in Žlunice as he gave up his appointment after disagreements with the pastor there. In 1852, after passing the mathematics teacher qualification exam, he went to Prague to study physics under F. A. Petřina. When he passed the physics qualification exam, he became a substitute teacher at the Piarist gymnasium in České Budějovice but did not attain a permanent appointment there. In 1862, Šimerka requested to return to spiritual administration and then was appointed became parish priest in Slatina nad Zdobnicí and then became a priest in Vraňany from 1866 until 1886. He died in Praskačka on 26 December 1887.

== Work ==
In 1858, his work Die Perioden der quadratischen Zahlformen bei negativen Determinanten was published in the reports of the Vienna Academy of Sciences. The same journal published his article Lösungen zweier Arten von Gleichungen a year later. In 1862, the Royal Czech Society published Přispěvky k neurčité analytice, his contributions to indeterminate analytics. His Die rationalen Dreiecke which deals with the diophantine problem of rational triangles was published in the Archiv der Mathematik und Physik in 1869 and is one of Šimerka's known contributions to the theory of factoring.

Šimerka is known for Algebra, čili, počtářství obecné pro vyšší gymnasia, his textbook on algebra published in 1863. Considered as his most important work, his algebra textbook for middle schools was published in three editions. The book's appendix giving an introduction to differential and integral calculus was published separately in 1864 under the title Přídavek k algebra, intended for the more inquisitive students. It is considered the first Czech text on calculus. Šimerka's calculus text presented differential calculus without using the concepts of limits and continuity. His use of differentials is similar to the infinitesimal approach of 17th and 18th century mathematicians. The calculus text focused on explaining the basic knowledge and intuition to teach students to use mathematics in practical tasks.

Šimerka was influenced by Johann Friedrich Herbart in his philosophical writings, having referred to the said philosopher in the introduction to his work Síla přesvědčení. Pocus v duchovní mechanice (originally published in Časopis pro pěstování mathematiky a fysiky in 1881, then translated into German in 1883 as Die Kraft der Überzeugung. Ein mathematisch-philosophischer Versuch). In this work, Šimerka set out to indicate the strength of one's belief using numbers between 0 and 1, where a belief of value 0 is an empty mind, increasing to a hunch, then conjecture then hypothesis then ultimately to necessary knowledge for a belief of value 1. Šimerka is quoted to have said "The imperfection of human belief is equal to the product of ignorance of its reasons" (translated from Czech), which arose from his calculations dealing with strength of belief in his 1881 paper. Other results from this paper include "When two conflicting beliefs collide, the weaker suffers more than the stronger" and "The double impact of two counterarguments damages conviction more than the single impact of their consequence". This work was a forerunner of the theory of subjective probability, pre-dating Ramsey's (1931) and Bruno de Finetti's (1937) work on the subject. Due to this, Šimerka was the first Czech mathematician to apply of mathematics in psychology.

In 1885, he enumerated the first seven Carmichael numbers, from 561 to 8911, in Zbytky z arithmetické posloupnosti. This was years before Alwin Korselt's criterion hinted at their existence in 1899 and also before Robert Daniel Carmichael's popularized first example in 1912.

== Selected works ==
- Šimerka, W. (1858), "Die Perioden der quadratischen Zahlformen bei negativen Determinanten", Sitzungsberichte der Akademie der Wissenschaften Mathematisch-naturwissenschaftliche Klasse, 31 (18): 33–57
- Šimerka, W. (1858), "Die Lösungen zweier Arten von Gleichungen", Sitzungsberichte der Akademie der Wissenschaften Mathematisch-naturwissenschaftliche Klasse, 33: 277–284
- Šimerka, W. (1859), Die trinären Zahlformen und Zahlwerthe, vol. 38, pp. 390–481
- Šimerka, W. (1866), "Die rationalen Dreiecke", Archiv der Mathematik und Physik, 51: 196–422
- Součty celých v lomené arithmetické posloupnosti
- Řetězové pravidlo u shod
- Jednočlenná perioda zbytků z mocnin bes předchozích členů…
- Jednočlenná perioda zbytků z mocnin s pťechcházejícími členy
- Šimerka, V. (1879), "Poznámka [z teorie čísel]" (PDF), Časopis pro pěstování matematiky a fysiky, 8 (4): 187–188, doi:10.21136/CPMF.1879.123540
- Šimerka, V. (1882), "Síla přesvědčení. Pocus v duchovní mechanice" (PDF), Časopis pro pěstování matematiky a fysiky, 11 (2): 75–111, doi:10.21136/CPMF.1882.122070
- Šimerka, W. (1885), "Zbytky z arithmetické posloupnosti" (PDF), Časopis pro pěstování matematiky a fysiky, 14 (5): 221–225, doi:10.21136/CPMF.1885.122245
- Dampfkessel und Dampfmaschinen und ihre Wartung (Plzeň, 1889)
