= Daniel Larsen (mathematician) =

American mathematician (born 2003)

- Born: 2003 (age 22–23); Indiana, U.S.
- Education: Massachusetts Institute of Technology (2026)
- Known for: Work on Carmichael numbers
- Awards: Morgan Prize Honorable Mention (2026)

Daniel C. Larsen (born 2003) is an American mathematician known for proving a 1994 conjecture of W. R. Alford, Andrew Granville and Carl Pomerance on the distribution of Carmichael numbers, commonly known as Bertrand's postulate for Carmichael numbers. He received an Honorable Mention for the 2026 Frank and Brennie Morgan Prize for Outstanding Research in Mathematics by an Undergraduate Student for his work on Carmichael numbers.

== Childhood and education ==
Larsen was born in 2003 to Indiana University Bloomington mathematics professors Michael J. Larsen and Ayelet Lindenstrauss (sister of Elon Lindenstrauss), and grew up in Bloomington, Indiana. He had a strong interest in mathematics as a child, inspired by the mathematician background of both his parents. His father hosted a math circle when he was younger that taught math on the weekend to kids in the neighborhood and Larsen attended despite being only four years old. He also had an enthusiasm in other projects, learning violin at age 5 and piano at age 6, along with practicing solving larger configurations of Rubik's Cubes and designing his own coin-sorting robot from Lego. He competed in the Scripps National Spelling Bee twice while in middle school, though he never made it to the final round.

While attending Bloomington High School South, he became the youngest accepted contributor to The New York Times crossword puzzle in February 2017 and ended up submitting 11 approved puzzles before his graduation from high school. He applied to and became a finalist in the 2022 Regeneron Science Talent Search for his published research on Carmichael numbers and ultimately won 4th place in the competition, winning $100,000 to pay for his college tuition. In the fall of 2022, he began attending university at the Massachusetts Institute of Technology (MIT). He graduated in 2026 with a Bachelor of Science in mathematics and a minor in physics.

== Career and research ==
During his teenage years, after watching a documentary about Yitang Zhang, Larsen became interested in number theory and the twin prime conjecture in particular. The subsequent strengthening of Zhang's method by James Maynard and Terence Tao not long after rekindled his desire to better understand the math involved. He found it too complex at that time, and it wasn't until after reading a paper in February 2021 on Carmichael numbers that he gained insight on the fundamentals of the problem. In November of the same year, Larsen published a paper titled "Bertrand's Postulate for Carmichael Numbers" on the open access repository arXiv that made a more consolidated proof of Maynard and Tao's postulate but involving Carmichael numbers into the twin primes conjecture and attempting to shorten the distance between the numbers per Bertrand's postulate. He concretely showed that for any ${\displaystyle \delta >0}$ and sufficiently large ${\displaystyle x}$ in terms of ${\displaystyle \delta }$, there will always be at least

$${\displaystyle \exp {\left({\frac {\log {x}}{(\log \log {x})^{2+\delta }}}\right)}}$$

Carmichael numbers between ${\displaystyle x}$ and

$${\displaystyle x+{\frac {x}{(\log {x})^{\frac {1}{2+\delta }}}}.}$$

He then emailed a copy of the paper to mathematician Andrew Granville and others involved in number theory research. The paper was later published in the journal International Mathematics Research Notices. An earlier paper of his on self-similar sequences appeared in The Fibonacci Quarterly.

As an undergraduate at MIT, Larsen continued working on Carmichael numbers. In an April 2025 preprint, "Carmichael Numbers in All Possible Arithmetic Progressions," he proved that every arithmetic progression either contains infinitely many Carmichael numbers or none at all, and gave a simple criterion for distinguishing the two cases. As a consequence, he established that $\liminf_{n\text{ Carmichael}}\varphi(n)/n=0$, resolving another question raised by Alford, Granville, and Pomerance in their 1994 paper. Subsequent work with Thomas Wright established the existence of Carmichael numbers with any specified number of prime factors, and a 2026 paper with his father, Michael J. Larsen, addressed robust additive bases.

In November 2025, Larsen received an Honorable Mention for the 2026 Frank and Brennie Morgan Prize for Outstanding Research in Mathematics by an Undergraduate Student, awarded jointly by the American Mathematical Society, the Mathematical Association of America, and the Society for Industrial and Applied Mathematics. The prize citation noted his "substantial contributions to long-standing conjectures in analytic number theory about Carmichael numbers, which show a high level of creativity and mastery of many different tools and approaches in number theory."
