= James H. Weaver =

James H. Weaver may refer to:

- Jim Weaver (Oregon politician) (1927–2020), U.S. congressman from Oregon
- James H. Weaver (Alabama politician), Secretary of State of Alabama, 1856–1860
- James Henry Weaver (1883–1942), American mathematician
