= Robert Daniel Carmichael =

American mathematician (1879–1967)

Robert D. Carmichael
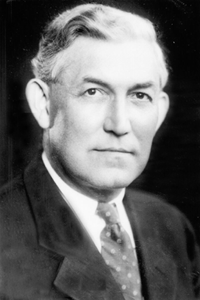
- Born: March 1, 1879; Goodwater, Alabama, US
- Died: May 2, 1967 (aged 88); Merriam, Kansas, US
- Education: Princeton University; Lineville College
- Scientific career
- Fields: Mathematics
- Workplaces: University of Illinois; Indiana University
- Thesis: Linear Difference Equations and their Analytic Solutions (1911)
- Doctoral advisor: G. D. Birkhoff
- Doctoral students: William Martin

Robert Daniel Carmichael (March 1, 1879 – May 2, 1967) was an American mathematician.

== Biography ==
Carmichael was born in Goodwater, Alabama. He attended Lineville College in Clay County, Alabama, briefly, and he earned his bachelor's degree in 1898, while he was studying towards his Ph.D. degree at Princeton University. Carmichael completed the requirements for his Ph.D. in mathematics in 1911. Carmichael's Ph.D. research in mathematics was done under the guidance of the noted American mathematician G. David Birkhoff, and it is considered to be the first significant American contribution to the knowledge of differential equations in mathematics.

Carmichael next taught at Indiana University from 1911 to 1915. Then he moved on to the University of Illinois, where he remained from 1915 until his retirement in 1947.

Carmichael is known for his research in what are now called the Carmichael numbers (a subset of Fermat pseudoprimes, numbers satisfying properties of primes described by Fermat's Little Theorem although they are not primes), Carmichael's totient function conjecture, Carmichael's theorem, and the Carmichael function, all significant in number theory and in the study of the prime numbers. He found the smallest Carmichael number, 561, 25 years after Václav Šimerka published the first seven in 1885. Over 50 years later, it was proven that there are infinitely many of them. Carmichael also described the Steiner system S(5,8,24) in his 1931 paper Tactical Configurations of Rank 2 and his 1937 book Introduction to the Theory of Groups of Finite Order, but the structure is often named after Ernst Witt, who rediscovered it in 1938.

While at Indiana University, Carmichael was involved with the special theory of relativity.

== Relatives ==
Carmichael's younger brother was university administrator Oliver Carmichael.

== Mathematical publications ==
- The Theory of Relativity, 1st edition, New York: John Wiley & Sons, Inc., pp. 74, 1913.
- The Theory of Numbers, New York: John Wiley & Sons, Inc., pp. 94, 1914.
- Diophantine analysis, 1st edition, New York: John Wiley & Sons, Inc., pp. 118, 1915.
- The Theory of Relativity. 2nd edition, New York: John Wiley & Sons, Inc., pp. 112, 1920.
- A Debate on the Theory of Relativity, with an introduction by William Lowe Bryan, Chicago: Open Court Pub. CO., pp. 154, 1927.
- The calculus, Robert D. Carmichael and James H. Weaver, Boston/New York: Ginn & company, pp. 345, 1927.
- The Logic of Discovery, Chicago/London: Open Court Publishing CO., pp. 280, 1930; Reprinted of Arno press, New York, 1975
- Mathematical Tables and Formulas, Robert D. Carmichael and Edwin R. Smith, Boston: Ginn & company, pp. 269, 1931; Reprint of Dover Publications, Inc., New York, 1962.
- The calculus, revised edition by Robert D. Carmichael, James H. Weaver and Lincoln La Paz, Boston/New York: Ginn & company, pp. 384, 1937.
- Introduction to the Theory of Groups of finite order, Boston/New York: Ginn & company, pp. 447, 1937; Reprint of Dover Publications, Inc., New York, 1956.

== See also ==
- Carmichael number
- Pseudoprime
