= Prime suspect (disambiguation) =

A prime suspect is the person who is considered by the law enforcement agency investigating a crime to be the most likely suspect.

Prime Suspect or Prime Suspects may also refer to:

== Film ==
- Prime Suspect, a 1982 American television film directed by Noel Black
- Prime Suspect (film), a 1989 American thriller film directed by Bruce Kimmel

== Television ==
- Prime Suspect, a 1991–2006 British police procedural television drama series
- Prime Suspect 1973, a 2017 prequel to the British drama series
- Prime Suspect (American TV series), an NBC television drama series adapted from the British series
- Prime Suspect (American TV program), a syndicated television program that aired from 1992 to 1995.
- "Prime Suspect" (NCIS), the 17th episode of the tenth season of the American police procedural drama NCIS

== Other ==
- Prime Suspects, an American rap group
- Prime Suspects: The Anatomy of Integers and Permutations, a graphic novel about mathematical concepts
- Mystery Case Files: Prime Suspects, a 2006 video game in the Mystery Case Files series
