= Michael J. Larsen =

American mathematician

Michael Larsen
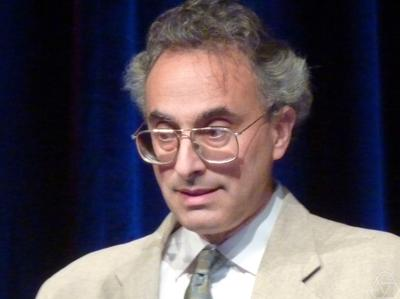
- Education: Princeton University; Harvard University
- Awards: Putnam Fellow (1981, 1983)
- Scientific career
- Fields: Mathematics
- Workplaces: University of Pennsylvania; University of Missouri; Indiana University Bloomington
- Thesis: Unitary groups and L-adic representations (1988)
- Doctoral advisor: Gerd Faltings

Michael Jeffrey Larsen is an American mathematician, a distinguished professor of mathematics at Indiana University Bloomington.

== Academic biography ==
In high school, Larsen tied with four other competitors for the top score in the 1977 International Mathematical Olympiad in Belgrade, winning a gold medal. As an undergraduate mathematics student at Harvard University, Larsen became a Putnam Fellow in 1981 and 1983. He graduated from Harvard in 1984, and earned his Ph.D. from Princeton University in 1988, under the supervision of Gerd Faltings. After working at the Institute for Advanced Study he joined the faculty of the University of Pennsylvania in 1990, and then moved to the University of Missouri in 1997. He joined the Indiana University faculty in 2001.

His wife Ayelet Lindenstrauss (Elon Lindenstrauss' sister) is also a mathematician and Indiana University professor. Their son Daniel at age 13 became the youngest person to publish a crossword in the New York Times. In 2022, Daniel published a discovery about Carmichael numbers.

== Research ==
Larsen is known for his research in arithmetic algebraic geometry, combinatorial group theory, combinatorics, and number theory. He has written highly cited papers on domino tiling of Aztec diamonds, topological quantum computing, and on the representation theory of braid groups.

== Awards and honors ==
In 2013 he became a fellow of the American Mathematical Society, for "contributions to group theory, number theory, topology, and algebraic geometry". He received the E. H. Moore Research Article Prize of the AMS in 2013 (jointly with Richard Pink).

== Selected publications ==
- Elkies, Noam; Kuperberg, Greg; Larsen, Michael; Propp, James (1992), "Alternating-sign matrices and domino tilings. I", Journal of Algebraic Combinatorics, 1 (2): 111–132, arXiv:math.CO/9201305, doi:10.1023/A:1022420103267, MR 1226347, S2CID 41082861.
- Freedman, Michael H.; Larsen, Michael; Wang, Zhenghan (2002a), "A modular functor which is universal for quantum computation", Communications in Mathematical Physics, 227 (3): 605–622, arXiv:quant-ph/0001108, Bibcode:2002CMaPh.227..605F, doi:10.1007/s002200200645, MR 1910833, S2CID 8990600.
- Freedman, Michael H.; Larsen, Michael J.; Wang, Zhenghan (2002b), "The two-eigenvalue problem and density of Jones representation of braid groups", Communications in Mathematical Physics, 228 (1): 177–199, arXiv:math/0103200, Bibcode:2002CMaPh.228..177F, doi:10.1007/s002200200636, MR 1911253, S2CID 8163385.
- Freedman, Michael H.; Kitaev, Alexei; Larsen, Michael J.; Wang, Zhenghan (2003), "Topological quantum computation", Bulletin of the American Mathematical Society, 40 (1): 31–38, arXiv:quant-ph/0101025, doi:10.1090/S0273-0979-02-00964-3, MR 1943131.
