= Chinese hypothesis =

Disproven conjecture for a primality test

In number theory, the Chinese hypothesis is a disproven conjecture stating that an integer n is prime if and only if it satisfies the condition that $2^n-2$ is divisible by n—in other words, that an integer n is prime if and only if $2^n \equiv 2 \bmod{n}$. It is true that if n is prime, then $2^n \equiv 2 \bmod{n}$ (this is a special case of Fermat's little theorem), however the converse (if $2^n \equiv 2 \bmod{n}$ then n is prime) is false, and therefore the hypothesis as a whole is false. The smallest counterexample is n = 341 = 11×31. Composite numbers n for which $2^n-2$ is divisible by n are called Poulet numbers. They are a special class of Fermat pseudoprimes.

== History ==
Once, and sometimes still, mistakenly thought to be of ancient Chinese origin, the Chinese hypothesis actually originates in the mid-19th century from the work of Qing dynasty mathematician Li Shanlan (1811–1882). He was later made aware his statement was incorrect and removed it from his subsequent work but it was not enough to prevent the false proposition from appearing elsewhere under his name; a later mistranslation in the 1898 work of Jeans dated the conjecture to Confucian times and gave birth to the ancient origin myth.
