= Vysoké Veselí =

- Town
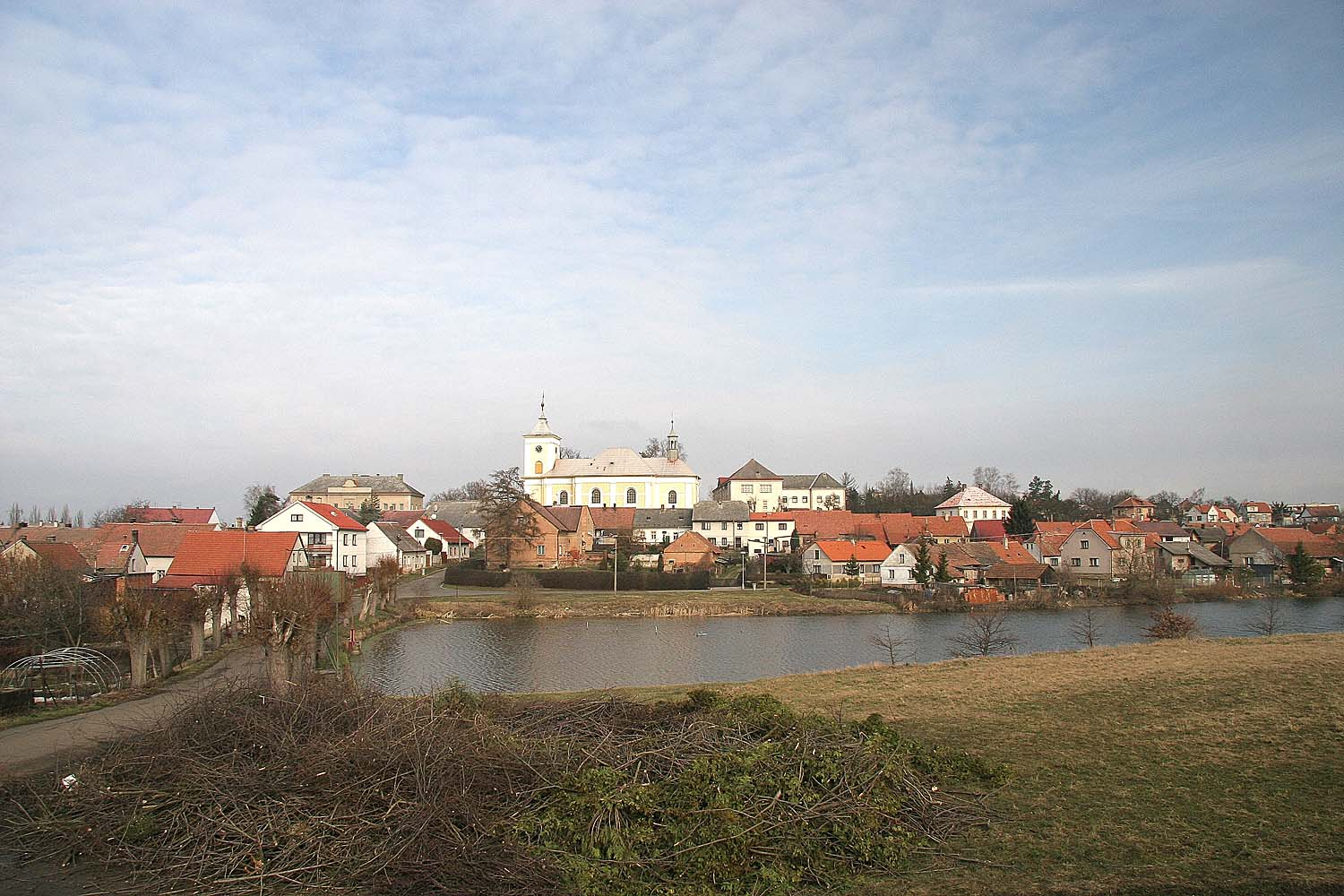
- Panorama of Vysoké Veselí

- Flag Coat of arms

- Location in the Czech Republic
- Coordinates: 50°19′58″N 15°26′23″E
- Country: Czech Republic
- Region: Hradec Králové
- District: Jičín
- First mentioned: 1283

Government
  - Mayor: Luboš Holman

Area
  - Total: 9.34 km^{2} (3.61 sq mi)
- Elevation: 254 m (833 ft)

Population (2026-01-01)
  - Total: 889
  - Density: 95.2/km^{2} (247/sq mi)
- Time zone: UTC+1 (CET)
  - Summer (DST): UTC+2 (CEST)
- Postal code: 507 03
- Website: www.vysokeveseli.cz

Vysoké Veselí (Czech pronunciation: [ˈvɪsokɛː ˈvɛsɛliː]) is a town in Jičín District in the Hradec Králové Region of the Czech Republic. It has about 900 inhabitants.

== Administrative division ==
Vysoké Veselí consists of two municipal parts (in brackets population according to the 2021 census):

- Vysoké Veselí (813)
- Veselská Lhota (61)

== Geography ==
Vysoké Veselí is located about 13 kilometres (8 mi) south of Jičín and 30 km (19 mi) northwest of Hradec Králové. It lies in the East Elbe Table. The highest point is at 908 m (2,979 ft) above sea level. The Cidlina River flows through the town. The town proper is situated between two fishponds called Vysokoveselský rybník and Šmejkal.

== History ==
The first written mention of Vysoké Veselí is from 1283, when it was already a market town, owned by the Vartenberk family. They owned it until 1438, then the estate was split and only a few of the nearest villages were managed from Vysoké Veselí. The owners often changed until 1533, when the Dohalský of Dohalice family acquired Vysoké Veselí by marriage. They enlarged the estate and had rebuilt the local fortress into a Renaissance residence.

In 1627–1634, Vysoké Veselí was property by Albrecht von Wallenstein, then it was acquired by Heřman Nidrum of Šardek. The Dohalský of Dohalice family owned the market town once again in 1654–1672. In the second half of the 17th century, during the rule of the Záruba of Hustířany family, Vysoké Veselí ceased to be the centre of the estate and the fortress fell into disrepair.

In the 19th century, Vysoké Veselí was industrialised. In 1908, it was promoted to a town by Emperor Franz Joseph I.

== Demographics ==
Historical population

Year	Pop.	±%
1869	1,642	—
1880	1,798	+9.5%
1890	1,694	−5.8%
1900	1,607	−5.1%
1910	1,612	+0.3%

Year	Pop.	±%
1921	1,605	−0.4%
1930	1,451	−9.6%
1950	1,116	−23.1%
1961	1,024	−8.2%
1970	890	−13.1%

Year	Pop.	±%
1980	889	−0.1%
1991	847	−4.7%
2001	849	+0.2%
2011	863	+1.6%
2021	874	+1.3%

Source: Censuses

== Transport ==
There are no railways or major roads running through the municipal territory.

== Sights ==
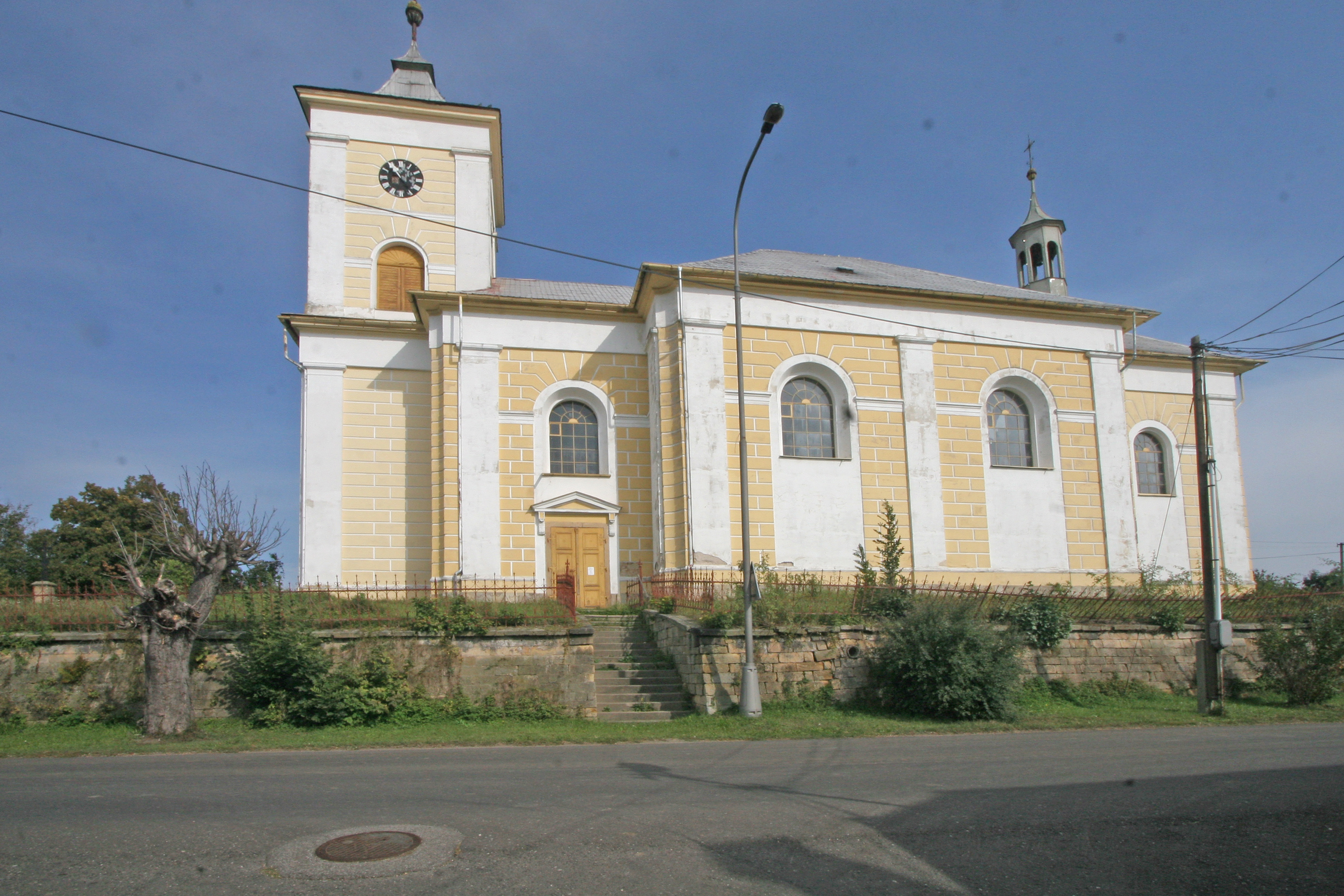
Church of Saint Nicholas of Tolentino

The main landmark of Vysoké Veselí is the Church of Saint Nicholas of Tolentino. It was originally a Baroque building from 1770, but it was destroyed by a fire in 1835. In 1835–1840, the church was completely rebuilt in the Empire style.

The former fortress was rebuilt into a Baroque castle in 1745. it was also damaged by the 1835 fire and rebuilt in the Empire style. In 1950–1974, the building was adapted to a school and lost its architectural value. Today it serves as a kindergarten.

== Notable people ==
- Friedrich Franz (1783–1860), mathematician and priest
- Václav Šimerka (1819–1887), mathematician and priest
