= Fermat pseudoprime =

Composite number that passes Fermat's probable primality test

In number theory, the Fermat pseudoprimes make up the most important class of pseudoprimes that come from Fermat's little theorem.

== Definition ==
Fermat's little theorem states that if $p$ is prime and $a$ is coprime to $p$, then $a^{p-1}-1$ is divisible by $p$. For a positive integer $a$, if a composite integer $x$ divides $a^{x-1}-1$ then $x$ is called a Fermat pseudoprime to base $a$.

In other words, a composite integer is a Fermat pseudoprime to base $a$ if it successfully passes the Fermat primality test for the base $a$. The false statement that all numbers that pass the Fermat primality test for base 2 are prime is called the Chinese hypothesis.

The smallest base-2 Fermat pseudoprime is 341. It is not a prime, since it equals 11·31, but it satisfies Fermat's little theorem: $2^{340} \equiv 1 (\bmod{341})$ and thus passes the Fermat primality test for the base 2.

Pseudoprimes to base 2 are sometimes called Sarrus numbers, after P. F. Sarrus who discovered that 341 has this property, Poulet numbers, after P. Poulet who made a table of such numbers, or Fermatians (sequence A001567 in the OEIS).

A Fermat pseudoprime is often called a pseudoprime, with the modifier Fermat being understood.

An integer $x$ that is a Fermat pseudoprime for all values of $a$ that are coprime to $x$ is called a Carmichael number.

== Properties ==
=== Distribution ===
There are infinitely many pseudoprimes to any given base $a > 1$. In 1904, Cipolla showed how to produce an infinite number of pseudoprimes to base $a > 1$: let $A = (a^p-1)/(a-1)$ and let $B = (a^p+1)/(a+1)$, where $p$ is a prime number that does not divide $a(a^2-1)$. Then $n= AB$ is composite, and is a pseudoprime to base $a$. For example, if $a=2$ and $p=5$, then $A=31$, $B=11$, and $n=AB=341$ is a pseudoprime to base $2$.

In fact, there are infinitely many strong pseudoprimes to any base greater than 1 (see Theorem 1 of) and infinitely many Carmichael numbers, but they are comparatively rare. There are three pseudoprimes to base 2 below 1000, 245 below one million, and 21853 less than 25·10^{9}. There are 4842 strong pseudoprimes base 2 and 2163 Carmichael numbers below this limit (see Table 1 of).

Starting at 17·257, the product of consecutive Fermat numbers is a base-2 pseudoprime, and so are all Fermat composites and Mersenne composites.

The probability of a composite number n passing the Fermat test approaches zero for $n \to\infty$. Specifically, Kim and Pomerance showed the following: The probability that a random odd number $n \le x$ is a Fermat pseudoprime to a random base $1<b<n-1$ is less than 2.77·10^{−8} for x= 10^{100}, and is at most (log x)^{−197}<10^{−10,000} for x≥10^{100,000}. For a fixed base b, the proportion of pseudoprimes up to x is at most e^{-log x log log log x/(2 log log x)} for large x.

=== Factorizations ===
The factorizations of the 60 Poulet numbers up to 60787, including 13 Carmichael numbers (in bold), are in the following table.

(sequence A001567 in the OEIS)

Poulet 1 to 15
341	11 · 31
**561**	3 · 11 · 17
645	3 · 5 · 43
**1105**	5 · 13 · 17
1387	19 · 73
**1729**	7 · 13 · 19
1905	3 · 5 · 127
2047	23 · 89
**2465**	5 · 17 · 29
2701	37 · 73
**2821**	7 · 13 · 31
3277	29 · 113
4033	37 · 109
4369	17 · 257
4371	3 · 31 · 47

Poulet 16 to 30
4681	31 · 151
5461	43 · 127
**6601**	7 · 23 · 41
7957	73 · 109
8321	53 · 157
8481	3 · 11 · 257
**8911**	7 · 19 · 67
10261	31 · 331
**10585**	5 · 29 · 73
11305	5 · 7 · 17 · 19
12801	3 · 17 · 251
13741	7 · 13 · 151
13747	59 · 233
13981	11 · 31 · 41
14491	43 · 337

Poulet 31 to 45
15709	23 · 683
**15841**	7 · 31 · 73
16705	5 · 13 · 257
18705	3 · 5 · 29 · 43
18721	97 · 193
19951	71 · 281
23001	3 · 11 · 17 · 41
23377	97 · 241
25761	3 · 31 · 277
**29341**	13 · 37 · 61
30121	7 · 13 · 331
30889	17 · 23 · 79
31417	89 · 353
31609	73 · 433
31621	103 · 307

Poulet 46 to 60
33153	3 · 43 · 257
34945	5 · 29 · 241
35333	89 · 397
39865	5 · 7 · 17 · 67
**41041**	7 · 11 · 13 · 41
41665	5 · 13 · 641
42799	127 · 337
**46657**	13 · 37 · 97
49141	157 · 313
49981	151 · 331
**52633**	7 · 73 · 103
55245	3 · 5 · 29 · 127
57421	7 · 13 · 631
60701	101 · 601
60787	89 · 683

A Poulet number all of whose divisors d divide 2^{d} − 2 is called a super-Poulet number. There are infinitely many Poulet numbers which are not super-Poulet Numbers.

=== Smallest Fermat pseudoprimes ===
The smallest pseudoprime for each base a ≤ 200 is given in the following table; the colors mark the number of prime factors. Unlike in the definition at the start of the article, pseudoprimes below a are excluded in the table. (For that to allow pseudoprimes below a, see (sequence A090086 in the OEIS))

(sequence A007535 in the OEIS)

a	smallest p-p	a	smallest p-p	a	smallest p-p	a	smallest p-p
1	4 = 2²	51	65 = 5 · 13	101	175 = 5² · 7	151	175 = 5² · 7
2	341 = 11 · 31	52	85 = 5 · 17	102	133 = 7 · 19	152	153 = 3² · 17
3	91 = 7 · 13	53	65 = 5 · 13	103	133 = 7 · 19	153	209 = 11 · 19
4	15 = 3 · 5	54	55 = 5 · 11	104	105 = 3 · 5 · 7	154	155 = 5 · 31
5	124 = 2² · 31	55	63 = 3² · 7	105	451 = 11 · 41	155	231 = 3 · 7 · 11
6	35 = 5 · 7	56	57 = 3 · 19	106	133 = 7 · 19	156	217 = 7 · 31
7	25 = 5²	57	65 = 5 · 13	107	133 = 7 · 19	157	186 = 2 · 3 · 31
8	9 = 3²	58	133 = 7 · 19	108	341 = 11 · 31	158	159 = 3 · 53
9	28 = 2² · 7	59	87 = 3 · 29	109	117 = 3² · 13	159	247 = 13 · 19
10	33 = 3 · 11	60	341 = 11 · 31	110	111 = 3 · 37	160	161 = 7 · 23
11	15 = 3 · 5	61	91 = 7 · 13	111	190 = 2 · 5 · 19	161	190 = 2 · 5 · 19
12	65 = 5 · 13	62	63 = 3² · 7	112	121 = 11²	162	481 = 13 · 37
13	21 = 3 · 7	63	341 = 11 · 31	113	133 = 7 · 19	163	186 = 2 · 3 · 31
14	15 = 3 · 5	64	65 = 5 · 13	114	115 = 5 · 23	164	165 = 3 · 5 · 11
15	341 = 11 · 31	65	112 = 2⁴ · 7	115	133 = 7 · 19	165	172 = 2² · 43
16	51 = 3 · 17	66	91 = 7 · 13	116	117 = 3² · 13	166	301 = 7 · 43
17	45 = 3² · 5	67	85 = 5 · 17	117	145 = 5 · 29	167	231 = 3 · 7 · 11
18	25 = 5²	68	69 = 3 · 23	118	119 = 7 · 17	168	169 = 13²
19	45 = 3² · 5	69	85 = 5 · 17	119	177 = 3 · 59	169	231 = 3 · 7 · 11
20	21 = 3 · 7	70	169 = 13²	120	121 = 11²	170	171 = 3² · 19
21	55 = 5 · 11	71	105 = 3 · 5 · 7	121	133 = 7 · 19	171	215 = 5 · 43
22	69 = 3 · 23	72	85 = 5 · 17	122	123 = 3 · 41	172	247 = 13 · 19
23	33 = 3 · 11	73	111 = 3 · 37	123	217 = 7 · 31	173	205 = 5 · 41
24	25 = 5²	74	75 = 3 · 5²	124	125 = 5³	174	175 = 5² · 7
25	28 = 2² · 7	75	91 = 7 · 13	125	133 = 7 · 19	175	319 = 11 · 19
26	27 = 3³	76	77 = 7 · 11	126	247 = 13 · 19	176	177 = 3 · 59
27	65 = 5 · 13	77	247 = 13 · 19	127	153 = 3² · 17	177	196 = 2² · 7²
28	45 = 3² · 5	78	341 = 11 · 31	128	129 = 3 · 43	178	247 = 13 · 19
29	35 = 5 · 7	79	91 = 7 · 13	129	217 = 7 · 31	179	185 = 5 · 37
30	49 = 7²	80	81 = 3⁴	130	217 = 7 · 31	180	217 = 7 · 31
31	49 = 7²	81	85 = 5 · 17	131	143 = 11 · 13	181	195 = 3 · 5 · 13
32	33 = 3 · 11	82	91 = 7 · 13	132	133 = 7 · 19	182	183 = 3 · 61
33	85 = 5 · 17	83	105 = 3 · 5 · 7	133	145 = 5 · 29	183	221 = 13 · 17
34	35 = 5 · 7	84	85 = 5 · 17	134	135 = 3³ · 5	184	185 = 5 · 37
35	51 = 3 · 17	85	129 = 3 · 43	135	221 = 13 · 17	185	217 = 7 · 31
36	91 = 7 · 13	86	87 = 3 · 29	136	265 = 5 · 53	186	187 = 11 · 17
37	45 = 3² · 5	87	91 = 7 · 13	137	148 = 2² · 37	187	217 = 7 · 31
38	39 = 3 · 13	88	91 = 7 · 13	138	259 = 7 · 37	188	189 = 3³ · 7
39	95 = 5 · 19	89	99 = 3² · 11	139	161 = 7 · 23	189	235 = 5 · 47
40	91 = 7 · 13	90	91 = 7 · 13	140	141 = 3 · 47	190	231 = 3 · 7 · 11
41	105 = 3 · 5 · 7	91	115 = 5 · 23	141	355 = 5 · 71	191	217 = 7 · 31
42	205 = 5 · 41	92	93 = 3 · 31	142	143 = 11 · 13	192	217 = 7 · 31
43	77 = 7 · 11	93	301 = 7 · 43	143	213 = 3 · 71	193	276 = 2² · 3 · 23
44	45 = 3² · 5	94	95 = 5 · 19	144	145 = 5 · 29	194	195 = 3 · 5 · 13
45	76 = 2² · 19	95	141 = 3 · 47	145	153 = 3² · 17	195	259 = 7 · 37
46	133 = 7 · 19	96	133 = 7 · 19	146	147 = 3 · 7²	196	205 = 5 · 41
47	65 = 5 · 13	97	105 = 3 · 5 · 7	147	169 = 13²	197	231 = 3 · 7 · 11
48	49 = 7²	98	99 = 3² · 11	148	231 = 3 · 7 · 11	198	247 = 13 · 19
49	66 = 2 · 3 · 11	99	145 = 5 · 29	149	175 = 5² · 7	199	225 = 3² · 5²
50	51 = 3 · 17	100	153 = 3² · 17	150	169 = 13²	200	201 = 3 · 67

=== List of Fermat pseudoprimes in fixed base n ===
n	First few Fermat pseudoprimes in base n	OEIS sequence
1	4, 6, 8, 9, 10, 12, 14, 15, 16, 18, 20, 21, 22, 24, 25, 26, 27, 28, 30, 32, 33, 34, 35, 36, 38, 39, 40, 42, 44, 45, 46, 48, 49, 50, 51, 52, 54, 55, 56, 57, 58, 60, 62, 63, 64, 65, 66, 68, 69, 70, 72, 74, 75, 76, 77, 78, 80, 81, 82, 84, 85, 86, 87, 88, 90, 91, 92, 93, 94, 95, 96, 98, 99, 100, ... (All composites)	A002808
2	341, 561, 645, 1105, 1387, 1729, 1905, 2047, 2465, 2701, 2821, 3277, 4033, 4369, 4371, 4681, 5461, 6601, 7957, 8321, 8481, 8911, ...	A001567
3	91, 121, 286, 671, 703, 949, 1105, 1541, 1729, 1891, 2465, 2665, 2701, 2821, 3281, 3367, 3751, 4961, 5551, 6601, 7381, 8401, 8911, ...	A005935
4	15, 85, 91, 341, 435, 451, 561, 645, 703, 1105, 1247, 1271, 1387, 1581, 1695, 1729, 1891, 1905, 2047, 2071, 2465, 2701, 2821, 3133, 3277, 3367, 3683, 4033, 4369, 4371, 4681, 4795, 4859, 5461, 5551, 6601, 6643, 7957, 8321, 8481, 8695, 8911, 9061, 9131, 9211, 9605, 9919, ...	A020136
5	4, 124, 217, 561, 781, 1541, 1729, 1891, 2821, 4123, 5461, 5611, 5662, 5731, 6601, 7449, 7813, 8029, 8911, 9881, ...	A005936
6	35, 185, 217, 301, 481, 1105, 1111, 1261, 1333, 1729, 2465, 2701, 2821, 3421, 3565, 3589, 3913, 4123, 4495, 5713, 6533, 6601, 8029, 8365, 8911, 9331, 9881, ...	A005937
7	6, 25, 325, 561, 703, 817, 1105, 1825, 2101, 2353, 2465, 3277, 4525, 4825, 6697, 8321, ...	A005938
8	9, 21, 45, 63, 65, 105, 117, 133, 153, 231, 273, 341, 481, 511, 561, 585, 645, 651, 861, 949, 1001, 1105, 1281, 1365, 1387, 1417, 1541, 1649, 1661, 1729, 1785, 1905, 2047, 2169, 2465, 2501, 2701, 2821, 3145, 3171, 3201, 3277, 3605, 3641, 4005, 4033, 4097, 4369, 4371, 4641, 4681, 4921, 5461, 5565, 5963, 6305, 6533, 6601, 6951, 7107, 7161, 7957, 8321, 8481, 8911, 9265, 9709, 9773, 9881, 9945, ...	A020137
9	4, 8, 28, 52, 91, 121, 205, 286, 364, 511, 532, 616, 671, 697, 703, 946, 949, 1036, 1105, 1288, 1387, 1541, 1729, 1891, 2465, 2501, 2665, 2701, 2806, 2821, 2926, 3052, 3281, 3367, 3751, 4376, 4636, 4961, 5356, 5551, 6364, 6601, 6643, 7081, 7381, 7913, 8401, 8695, 8744, 8866, 8911, ...	A020138
10	9, 33, 91, 99, 259, 451, 481, 561, 657, 703, 909, 1233, 1729, 2409, 2821, 2981, 3333, 3367, 4141, 4187, 4521, 5461, 6533, 6541, 6601, 7107, 7471, 7777, 8149, 8401, 8911, ...	A005939
11	10, 15, 70, 133, 190, 259, 305, 481, 645, 703, 793, 1105, 1330, 1729, 2047, 2257, 2465, 2821, 4577, 4921, 5041, 5185, 6601, 7869, 8113, 8170, 8695, 8911, 9730, ...	A020139
12	65, 91, 133, 143, 145, 247, 377, 385, 703, 1045, 1099, 1105, 1649, 1729, 1885, 1891, 2041, 2233, 2465, 2701, 2821, 2983, 3367, 3553, 5005, 5365, 5551, 5785, 6061, 6305, 6601, 8911, 9073, ...	A020140
13	4, 6, 12, 21, 85, 105, 231, 244, 276, 357, 427, 561, 1099, 1785, 1891, 2465, 2806, 3605, 5028, 5149, 5185, 5565, 6601, 7107, 8841, 8911, 9577, 9637, ...	A020141
14	15, 39, 65, 195, 481, 561, 781, 793, 841, 985, 1105, 1111, 1541, 1891, 2257, 2465, 2561, 2665, 2743, 3277, 5185, 5713, 6501, 6533, 6541, 7107, 7171, 7449, 7543, 7585, 8321, 9073, ...	A020142
15	14, 341, 742, 946, 1477, 1541, 1687, 1729, 1891, 1921, 2821, 3133, 3277, 4187, 6541, 6601, 7471, 8701, 8911, 9073, ...	A020143
16	15, 51, 85, 91, 255, 341, 435, 451, 561, 595, 645, 703, 1105, 1247, 1261, 1271, 1285, 1387, 1581, 1687, 1695, 1729, 1891, 1905, 2047, 2071, 2091, 2431, 2465, 2701, 2821, 3133, 3277, 3367, 3655, 3683, 4033, 4369, 4371, 4681, 4795, 4859, 5083, 5151, 5461, 5551, 6601, 6643, 7471, 7735, 7957, 8119, 8227, 8245, 8321, 8481, 8695, 8749, 8911, 9061, 9131, 9211, 9605, 9919, ...	A020144
17	4, 8, 9, 16, 45, 91, 145, 261, 781, 1111, 1228, 1305, 1729, 1885, 2149, 2821, 3991, 4005, 4033, 4187, 4912, 5365, 5662, 5833, 6601, 6697, 7171, 8481, 8911, ...	A020145
18	25, 49, 65, 85, 133, 221, 323, 325, 343, 425, 451, 637, 931, 1105, 1225, 1369, 1387, 1649, 1729, 1921, 2149, 2465, 2701, 2821, 2825, 2977, 3325, 4165, 4577, 4753, 5525, 5725, 5833, 5941, 6305, 6517, 6601, 7345, 8911, 9061, ...	A020146
19	6, 9, 15, 18, 45, 49, 153, 169, 343, 561, 637, 889, 905, 906, 1035, 1105, 1629, 1661, 1849, 1891, 2353, 2465, 2701, 2821, 2955, 3201, 4033, 4681, 5461, 5466, 5713, 6223, 6541, 6601, 6697, 7957, 8145, 8281, 8401, 8869, 9211, 9997, ...	A020147
20	21, 57, 133, 231, 399, 561, 671, 861, 889, 1281, 1653, 1729, 1891, 2059, 2413, 2501, 2761, 2821, 2947, 3059, 3201, 4047, 5271, 5461, 5473, 5713, 5833, 6601, 6817, 7999, 8421, 8911, ...	A020148
21	4, 10, 20, 55, 65, 85, 221, 703, 793, 1045, 1105, 1852, 2035, 2465, 3781, 4630, 5185, 5473, 5995, 6541, 7363, 8695, 8965, 9061, ...	A020149
22	21, 69, 91, 105, 161, 169, 345, 483, 485, 645, 805, 1105, 1183, 1247, 1261, 1541, 1649, 1729, 1891, 2037, 2041, 2047, 2413, 2465, 2737, 2821, 3241, 3605, 3801, 5551, 5565, 5963, 6019, 6601, 6693, 7081, 7107, 7267, 7665, 8119, 8365, 8421, 8911, 9453, ...	A020150
23	22, 33, 91, 154, 165, 169, 265, 341, 385, 451, 481, 553, 561, 638, 946, 1027, 1045, 1065, 1105, 1183, 1271, 1729, 1738, 1749, 2059, 2321, 2465, 2501, 2701, 2821, 2926, 3097, 3445, 4033, 4081, 4345, 4371, 4681, 5005, 5149, 6253, 6369, 6533, 6541, 7189, 7267, 7957, 8321, 8365, 8651, 8745, 8911, 8965, 9805, ...	A020151
24	25, 115, 175, 325, 553, 575, 805, 949, 1105, 1541, 1729, 1771, 1825, 1975, 2413, 2425, 2465, 2701, 2737, 2821, 2885, 3781, 4207, 4537, 6601, 6931, 6943, 7081, 7189, 7471, 7501, 7813, 8725, 8911, 9085, 9361, 9809, ...	A020152
25	4, 6, 8, 12, 24, 28, 39, 66, 91, 124, 217, 232, 276, 403, 426, 451, 532, 561, 616, 703, 781, 804, 868, 946, 1128, 1288, 1541, 1729, 1891, 2047, 2701, 2806, 2821, 2911, 2926, 3052, 3126, 3367, 3592, 3976, 4069, 4123, 4207, 4564, 4636, 4686, 5321, 5461, 5551, 5611, 5662, 5731, 5963, 6601, 7449, 7588, 7813, 8029, 8646, 8911, 9881, 9976, ...	A020153
26	9, 15, 25, 27, 45, 75, 133, 135, 153, 175, 217, 225, 259, 425, 475, 561, 589, 675, 703, 775, 925, 1035, 1065, 1147, 2465, 3145, 3325, 3385, 3565, 3825, 4123, 4525, 4741, 4921, 5041, 5425, 6093, 6475, 6525, 6601, 6697, 8029, 8695, 8911, 9073, ...	A020154
27	26, 65, 91, 121, 133, 247, 259, 286, 341, 365, 481, 671, 703, 949, 1001, 1105, 1541, 1649, 1729, 1891, 2071, 2465, 2665, 2701, 2821, 2981, 2993, 3146, 3281, 3367, 3605, 3751, 4033, 4745, 4921, 4961, 5299, 5461, 5551, 5611, 5621, 6305, 6533, 6601, 7381, 7585, 7957, 8227, 8321, 8401, 8911, 9139, 9709, 9809, 9841, 9881, 9919, ...	A020155
28	9, 27, 45, 87, 145, 261, 361, 529, 561, 703, 783, 785, 1105, 1305, 1413, 1431, 1885, 2041, 2413, 2465, 2871, 3201, 3277, 4553, 4699, 5149, 5181, 5365, 7065, 8149, 8321, 8401, 9841, ...	A020156
29	4, 14, 15, 21, 28, 35, 52, 91, 105, 231, 268, 341, 364, 469, 481, 561, 651, 793, 871, 1105, 1729, 1876, 1897, 2105, 2257, 2821, 3484, 3523, 4069, 4371, 4411, 5149, 5185, 5356, 5473, 5565, 5611, 6097, 6601, 7161, 7294, 8321, 8401, 8421, 8841, 8911, ...	A020157
30	49, 91, 133, 217, 247, 341, 403, 469, 493, 589, 637, 703, 871, 899, 901, 931, 1273, 1519, 1537, 1729, 2059, 2077, 2821, 3097, 3277, 3283, 3367, 3577, 4081, 4097, 4123, 5729, 6031, 6061, 6097, 6409, 6601, 6817, 7657, 8023, 8029, 8401, 8911, 9881, ...	A020158

For more information (base 31 to 100), see (sequence A020159 in the OEIS) to (sequence A020228 in the OEIS), and for all bases up to 150, see table of Fermat pseudoprimes (text in German), this page does not define n is a pseudoprime to a base congruent to 1 or −1 (mod n)

== Bases b for which n is a Fermat pseudoprime ==
If composite $n$ is even, then $n$ is a Fermat pseudoprime to the trivial base $b \equiv 1 \pmod n$. If composite $n$ is odd, then $n$ is a Fermat pseudoprime to the trivial bases $b \equiv \pm 1 \pmod n$.

For any composite $n$, the number of distinct bases $b$ modulo $n$, for which $n$ is a Fermat pseudoprime base $b$, is

$$\prod_{i=1}^k \gcd(p_i - 1, n - 1)$$

where $p_1, \dots, p_k$ are the distinct prime factors of $n$. This includes the trivial bases.

For example, for $n = 341 = 11 \cdot 31$, this product is $\gcd(10, 340) \cdot \gcd(30, 340) = 100$. For $n = 341$, the smallest such nontrivial base is $b = 2$.

Every odd composite $n$ is a Fermat pseudoprime to at least two nontrivial bases modulo $n$ unless $n$ is a power of 3.

For composite n < 200, the following is a table of all bases b < n which n is a Fermat pseudoprime. If a composite number n is not in the table (or n is in the sequence A209211), then n is a pseudoprime only to the trivial base 1 modulo n.

n	bases 0 < b < n to which n is a Fermat pseudoprime	# of bases OEIS: A063994
9	1, 8	2
15	1, 4, 11, 14	4
21	1, 8, 13, 20	4
25	1, 7, 18, 24	4
27	1, 26	2
28	1, 9, 25	3
33	1, 10, 23, 32	4
35	1, 6, 29, 34	4
39	1, 14, 25, 38	4
45	1, 8, 17, 19, 26, 28, 37, 44	8
49	1, 18, 19, 30, 31, 48	6
51	1, 16, 35, 50	4
52	1, 9, 29	3
55	1, 21, 34, 54	4
57	1, 20, 37, 56	4
63	1, 8, 55, 62	4
65	1, 8, 12, 14, 18, 21, 27, 31, 34, 38, 44, 47, 51, 53, 57, 64	16
66	1, 25, 31, 37, 49	5
69	1, 22, 47, 68	4
70	1, 11, 51	3
75	1, 26, 49, 74	4
76	1, 45, 49	3
77	1, 34, 43, 76	4
81	1, 80	2
85	1, 4, 13, 16, 18, 21, 33, 38, 47, 52, 64, 67, 69, 72, 81, 84	16
87	1, 28, 59, 86	4
91	1, 3, 4, 9, 10, 12, 16, 17, 22, 23, 25, 27, 29, 30, 36, 38, 40, 43, 48, 51, 53, 55, 61, 62, 64, 66, 68, 69, 74, 75, 79, 81, 82, 87, 88, 90	36
93	1, 32, 61, 92	4
95	1, 39, 56, 94	4
99	1, 10, 89, 98	4
105	1, 8, 13, 22, 29, 34, 41, 43, 62, 64, 71, 76, 83, 92, 97, 104	16
111	1, 38, 73, 110	4
112	1, 65, 81	3
115	1, 24, 91, 114	4
117	1, 8, 44, 53, 64, 73, 109, 116	8
119	1, 50, 69, 118	4
121	1, 3, 9, 27, 40, 81, 94, 112, 118, 120	10
123	1, 40, 83, 122	4
124	1, 5, 25	3
125	1, 57, 68, 124	4
129	1, 44, 85, 128	4
130	1, 61, 81	3
133	1, 8, 11, 12, 18, 20, 26, 27, 30, 31, 37, 39, 45, 46, 50, 58, 64, 65, 68, 69, 75, 83, 87, 88, 94, 96, 102, 103, 106, 107, 113, 115, 121, 122, 125, 132	36
135	1, 26, 109, 134	4
141	1, 46, 95, 140	4
143	1, 12, 131, 142	4
145	1, 12, 17, 28, 41, 46, 57, 59, 86, 88, 99, 104, 117, 128, 133, 144	16
147	1, 50, 97, 146	4
148	1, 121, 137	3
153	1, 8, 19, 26, 35, 53, 55, 64, 89, 98, 100, 118, 127, 134, 145, 152	16
154	1, 23, 67	3
155	1, 61, 94, 154	4
159	1, 52, 107, 158	4
161	1, 22, 139, 160	4
165	1, 23, 32, 34, 43, 56, 67, 76, 89, 98, 109, 122, 131, 133, 142, 164	16
169	1, 19, 22, 23, 70, 80, 89, 99, 146, 147, 150, 168	12
171	1, 37, 134, 170	4
172	1, 49, 165	3
175	1, 24, 26, 51, 74, 76, 99, 101, 124, 149, 151, 174	12
176	1, 49, 81, 97, 113	5
177	1, 58, 119, 176	4
183	1, 62, 121, 182	4
185	1, 6, 31, 36, 38, 43, 68, 73, 112, 117, 142, 147, 149, 154, 179, 184	16
186	1, 97, 109, 157, 163	5
187	1, 67, 120, 186	4
189	1, 55, 134, 188	4
190	1, 11, 61, 81, 101, 111, 121, 131, 161	9
195	1, 14, 64, 79, 116, 131, 181, 194	8
196	1, 165, 177	3

For more information (n = 201 to 5000), see b:de:Pseudoprimzahlen: Tabelle Pseudoprimzahlen (15 - 4999) (Table of pseudoprimes 16–4999). Unlike the list above, that page excludes the bases 1 and n−1. When p is a prime, p^{2} is a Fermat pseudoprime to base b if and only if p is a Wieferich prime to base b. For example, 1093^{2} = 1194649 is a Fermat pseudoprime to base 2, and 11^{2} = 121 is a Fermat pseudoprime to base 3.

The number of the values of b for n are (For n prime, the number of the values of b must be n − 1, since all b satisfy the Fermat little theorem)

1, 1, 2, 1, 4, 1, 6, 1, 2, 1, 10, 1, 12, 1, 4, 1, 16, 1, 18, 1, 4, 1, 22, 1, 4, 1, 2, 3, 28, 1, 30, 1, 4, 1, 4, 1, 36, 1, 4, 1, 40, 1, 42, 1, 8, 1, 46, 1, 6, 1, ... (sequence A063994 in the OEIS)

The least base b > 1 which n is a pseudoprime to base b (or prime number) are

2, 3, 2, 5, 2, 7, 2, 9, 8, 11, 2, 13, 2, 15, 4, 17, 2, 19, 2, 21, 8, 23, 2, 25, 7, 27, 26, 9, 2, 31, 2, 33, 10, 35, 6, 37, 2, 39, 14, 41, 2, 43, 2, 45, 8, 47, 2, 49, 18, 51, ... (sequence A105222 in the OEIS)

The number of the values of b for a given n must divide $\varphi$(n), or A000010(n) = 1, 1, 2, 2, 4, 2, 6, 4, 6, 4, 10, 4, 12, 6, 8, 8, 16, 6, 18, 8, 12, 10, 22, 8, 20, 12, 18, 12, 28, 8, 30, 16, 20, 16, 24, 12, 36, 18, 24, 16, 40, 12, 42, 20, 24, 22, 46, 16, 42, 20, ... The quotient can be any natural number, and the quotient = 1 if and only if n is a prime or a Carmichael number (561, 1105, 1729, 2465, 2821, 6601, 8911, 10585, 15841, ... A002997) The quotient = 2 if and only if n is in the sequence: 4, 6, 15, 91, 703, 1891, 2701, 11305, 12403, 13981, 18721, ... A191311.)

The least numbers which are pseudoprime to k values of b are (or 0 if no such number exists)

1, 3, 28, 5, 66, 7, 232, 45, 190, 11, 276, 13, 1106, 0, 286, 17, 1854, 19, 3820, 891, 2752, 23, 1128, 595, 2046, 0, 532, 29, 1770, 31, 9952, 425, 1288, 0, 2486, 37, 8474, 0, 742, 41, 3486, 43, 7612, 5589, 2356, 47, 13584, 325, 9850, 0, ... (sequence A064234 in the OEIS) (if and only if k is even and not totient of squarefree number, then the kth term of this sequence is 0.)

== Weak pseudoprimes ==
A composite number n which satisfies $b^n \equiv b \pmod n$ is called a weak pseudoprime to base b. For any given base b, all Fermat pseudoprimes are weak pseudoprimes, and all weak pseudoprimes coprime to b are Fermat pseudoprimes. However, this definition also permits some pseudoprimes which are not coprime to b. For example, the smallest even weak pseudoprime to base 2 is 161038 (see (sequence A006935 in the OEIS)).

The least weak pseudoprime to bases b = 1, 2, ... are:

4, 341, 6, 4, 4, 6, 6, 4, 4, 6, 10, 4, 4, 14, 6, 4, 4, 6, 6, 4, 4, 6, 22, 4, 4, 9, 6, 4, 4, 6, 6, 4, 4, 6, 9, 4, 4, 38, 6, 4, 4, 6, 6, 4, 4, 6, 46, 4, 4, 10, ... OEIS: A000790

Carmichael numbers are weak pseudoprimes to all bases, thus all terms in this list are less than or equal to the smallest Carmichael number, 561. Except for 561 = 3⋅11⋅17, only semiprimes can occur in the above sequence. Not all semiprimes less than 561 occur; a semiprime pq (p ≤ q) less than 561 occurs in the above sequences if and only if p − 1 divides q − 1 (see (sequence A108574 in the OEIS)). The least Fermat pseudoprime to base b (also not necessary exceeding b) ((sequence A090086 in the OEIS)) is usually semiprime, but not always; the first counterexample is A090086(648) = 385 = 5 × 7 × 11.

If we require n > b, the least weak pseudoprimes (for b = 1, 2, ...) are:

4, 341, 6, 6, 10, 10, 14, 9, 12, 15, 15, 22, 21, 15, 21, 20, 34, 25, 38, 21, 28, 33, 33, 25, 28, 27, 39, 36, 35, 49, 49, 33, 44, 35, 45, 42, 45, 39, 57, 52, 82, 66, 77, 45, 55, 69, 65, 49, 56, 51, ... OEIS: A239293

== Euler pseudoprimes ==
Euler pseudoprimes are a subset of the Fermat pseudoprimes for any given base $a$. There also exists absolute Euler pseudoprimes, which are a subset of the Carmichael numbers, and which are the analogue of Carmichael numbers for Euler pseudoprimes.

== Euler–Jacobi pseudoprimes ==
Another approach is to use more refined notions of pseudoprimality, e.g. strong pseudoprimes or Euler–Jacobi pseudoprimes, for which there are no analogues of Carmichael numbers. This leads to probabilistic algorithms such as the Solovay–Strassen primality test, the Baillie–PSW primality test, and the Miller–Rabin primality test, which produce what are known as industrial-grade primes. Industrial-grade primes are integers for which primality has not been "certified" (i.e. rigorously proven), but have undergone a test such as the Miller–Rabin test which has nonzero, but arbitrarily low, probability of failure.

== Applications ==
The rarity of such pseudoprimes has important practical implications. For example, public-key cryptography algorithms such as RSA require the ability to quickly find large primes. The usual algorithm to generate prime numbers is to generate random odd numbers and test them for primality. However, deterministic primality tests are slow. If the user is willing to tolerate an arbitrarily small chance that the number found is not a prime number but a pseudoprime, it is possible to use the much faster and simpler Fermat primality test.
