= Mittelherwigsdorf =

- Municipality
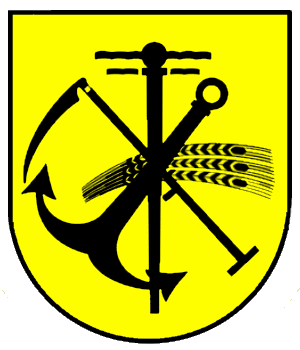
- Coat of arms

- Location of Mittelherwigsdorf within Görlitz district
- Interactive map of Mittelherwigsdorf
- Location within Germany Location within Saxony
- Coordinates: 50°55′0″N 14°45′50″E
- Country: Germany
- State: Saxony
- District: Görlitz
- Subdivisions: 4

Government
  - Mayor (2019–26): Markus Hallmann (FW)

Area
  - Total: 36.48 km^{2} (14.09 sq mi)
- Elevation: 304 m (997 ft)

Population (2025-12-31)
  - Total: 3,462
  - Density: 94.90/km^{2} (245.8/sq mi)
- Time zone: UTC+01:00 (CET)
  - Summer (DST): UTC+02:00 (CEST)
- Postal codes: 02763
- Dialling codes: 03583
- Vehicle registration: GR, LÖB, NOL, NY, WSW, ZI
- Website: www.mittelherwigsdorf.de

Mittelherwigsdorf is a municipality in the district Görlitz, in Saxony, Germany.

== See also ==
- Steinbruch Eckartsberg
