= Václav Špála =

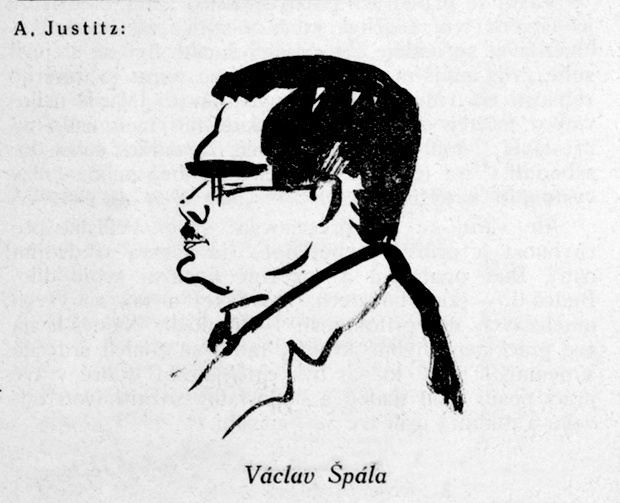
Václav Špála, cartoon by Alfréd Justitz, c. 1925

Václav Špála (24 August 1885 – 13 May 1946) was a Czech painter, graphic designer and illustrator.

== Life and career ==
Špála was born on 24 August 1885 in Žlunice. He studied at Prague Academy. He was a member of the group Tvrdošíjní ('The Obstinate') and exhibited with them. At the beginning of his career, his work was influenced by Fauvism, later by Cubism. From 1909 he was a member of the Manes Association. From 1911 he was also a member of the Group of Fine Artists in Prague, a group of young Czech modernists embracing cubism and including artists like Vincenc Beneš, Josef Čapek, Emil Filla or Otto Gutfreund. The Group of Fine Artists organized in 1912 two significant exhibitions in the newly opened exhibition halls of the Municipal House in Prague. Since 1923 he painted mainly landscapes and still-lives.

Václav Špála ranks among the greatest phenomena of Czech modern art. Czech society alternately rejected him and lavished him with uncritical praise. Špála remains one of the most searched-for artists in the country. His paintings decorate not only classrooms but also numerous offices and living rooms. Špála was one of the first artists to be recognised with the title National Artist, and was awarded it in 1946.

Špála died on 13 May 1946 in Prague. He is buried at the Vyšehrad Cemetery. Since 1959, The Václav Špála Gallery carries his name.

== See also ==
- Vlastimil Košvanec
