= Alwin Korselt =

German mathematician

Alwin Reinhold Korselt
- Born: 17 March 1864; Mittelherwigsdorf, Kingdom of Saxony
- Died: 4 February 1947 (aged 82); Plauen
- Education: University of Leipzig
- Known for: Korselt's Criterion
- Scientific career
- Fields: Mathematics
- Doctoral advisor: Otto Hölder and Carl Gottfried Neumann

Alwin Reinhold Korselt (17 March 1864, in Mittelherwigsdorf – 4 February 1947, in Plauen) was a German mathematician. He discovered Korselt's criterion, which provides a secondary definition for Carmichael numbers and also contributed an early result in algebraic logic.

== Personal life ==
The Korselts are a huge, widespread family that has been resident in the village of Mittelherwigsdorf near Zittau in Saxony (nowadays close to the Czech and Polish borders) since the early Middle Ages. Alwin Korselt was born there in 1864.

After attending Gymnasium in Zittau between 1876 and 1885, he studied mathematics and physics in Leipzig (with one semester in 1886 in Freiburg im Breisgau) until 1890. After a probationary year as a teacher at Nikolaigymnasium in Leipzig he taught from 1891 to 1898 at various schools in Pirna, Dresden, Keilhau near Rudolstadt, Löbau and Meerane. Frequent changes, often between very different school types, indicate that he found it difficult to gain ground in his profession. His first scientific publication, a voluminous review of Ernst Schröder's lectures on the Algebra of Logic, fell into this time (finished 1893). From 1898 till his retirement in 1924 he taught at Realschule Plauen.

He never married, and was well known for his shabby appearance, which was mostly because he found it hard to spend money on anything but books and cigars. In the 1930s he lost a leg through amputation, but remained scientifically active until around 1939. He died in Plauen in 1947 and was interred in Mittelherwigsdorf.

== Research ==
Korselt's 1902 dissertation at Leipzig University (adviser Otto Hölder) was titled Über die Möglichkeit der Lösung merkwürdiger Dreiecksaufgaben durch Winkelteilung ("On the Possibility of Solving Strange Triangle Problems by Angle Dissection"). Shortly afterwards he took part in controversy with Gottlob Frege, concerning Hilbert's axioms for the foundations of Euclidean geometry. He was treated by Frege as a partisan of Hilbert.

Korselt was influenced by Bolzano and had contact with Pringsheim, Hilbert, Russell, Fraenkel and Carathéodory.
