= William "Red" Alford =

American mathematician and lawyer (1937–2003)

Red Alford
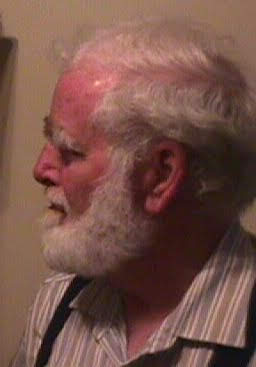
- Alford at the SERMON '99 conference
- Born: William Robert Alford; July 21, 1937; Canton, Mississippi, U.S.
- Died: May 29, 2003 (aged 65)
- Occupation(s): Mathematician, lawyer

William Robert "Red" Alford (July 21, 1937 – May 29, 2003) was an American mathematician and lawyer, who was best known for his work in the fields of topology and number theory.

== Personal life ==
Alford was born in Canton, Mississippi, to parents Clayton and Pennington Alford. After graduating high school, Alford became a member of the United States Air Force, and earned his Bachelor of Science in mathematics and physics from The Citadel (1959).

Subsequently, he earned his Ph.D. in mathematics from Tulane University (1963), and his J.D. from the University of Georgia School of Law (1976).

After earning his J.D., he practiced law in Athens, Georgia, before returning to the mathematics faculty at the University of Georgia. He retired in 2002, and died the next year from a brain tumor.

== Mathematics ==
Alford's dissertation at Tulane was entitled: Some Wild Embeddings of the One and Two Dimensional Spheres in the Three Sphere.

In 1994, in a paper with Andrew Granville and Carl Pomerance, he proved the infinitude of Carmichael numbers based on a conjecture given by Paul Erdős.

MathSciNet credits Alford with eleven publications, of which two were in the prestigious Annals of Mathematics - the Carmichael numbers paper, and a 1970 paper in knot theory.
