= Prime Suspects: The Anatomy of Integers and Permutations =

2019 graphic novel by Andrew Granville and Jennifer Granville

- First edition cover
- Author: Andrew Granville, Jennifer Granville
- Illustrator: Robert J. Lewis
- Language: English
- Genre: Graphic novel, Comics, Mathematical fiction, thriller, police procedural
- Publisher: Princeton University Press
- Publication date: August 6, 2019
- Publication place: United States
- Media type: Print (Softcover)
- Pages: 232 (6.62 x 9.25 in.)
- ISBN: 9780691149158

Prime Suspects: The Anatomy of Integers and Permutations is a graphic novel by Andrew Granville, Jennifer Granville, and Robert J. Lewis, released on August 6, 2019 and published by Princeton University Press.

== Plot ==
Prime Suspects: Anatomy of Integers and Permutations is a unique graphic novel that blurs the boundaries between pure visual art, deep mathematics, film noir and police procedurals whilst exploring the nature of scientific research, the role of women in mathematics and paying homage to the titans of mathematical history.

== Reception ==
Judith Reveal of the New York Journal of Books said that "Prime Suspects will appeal to... the mathematician who eats, sleeps, and drinks numbers, start on page one and just enjoy the story . . . the book is fun, and interesting, and a challenge on many levels."

Benjamin Linowitz of MAA Reviews stated that ". . . It's very difficult to write a book on an advanced topic in mathematics that's accessible to math students and enthusiasts yet touches on contemporary research that is of interest to a broad swath of practicing mathematicians. Prime Suspects is such a book. And it's entertaining to boot. I recommend it in the strongest terms."

Paolo Mancosu of the Journal Of Humanistic Mathematics said the book "does a terrific job at presenting readers with a fascinating and realistic picture of how mathematical research is conducted. It does so in a deep way and yet with a light hand without falling into the trap of transforming the novel into a lecture on advanced mathematics or on methodology. Both the story and the illustrations are a delight."
