= Steinbruch Eckartsberg =

Lake in Germany

- Location within Saxony
- Location: Saxony
- Coordinates: 50°55′34″N 14°48′0″E
- Primary inflows: none
- Primary outflows: none
- Basin countries: Germany
- Surface area: 0.6 ha (1.5 acres)
- Average depth: 14 m (46 ft)
- Max. depth: 17 m (56 ft)
- Surface elevation: 280 m (920 ft)

Steinbruch Eckartsberg is a lake in Saxony, Germany. At an elevation of 280 m, its surface area is 0.6 ha.
