= Cyclic number (group theory) =

Number n where n and totient(n) are coprime

A cyclic number is a natural number n such that n and φ(n) are coprime. Here φ is Euler's totient function. An equivalent definition is that a number n is cyclic if and only if any group of order n is cyclic.

Any prime number is clearly cyclic. All cyclic numbers are square-free. Let n = p_{1} p_{2} ... p_{k}, where the p_{i} are distinct primes, then φ(n) = (p_{1} − 1)(p_{2} − 1)...(p_{k} − 1). If no p_{i} divides any (p_{j} − 1), then n and φ(n) have no common (prime) divisor, and n is cyclic.

The first non-prime cyclic numbers are 1, 15, 33, 35, 51, 65, 69, 77, 85, 87, 91, 95, 115, 119, 123, 133, 141, 143, 145, 159, 161, 177, 185, 187, 209, 213, 215, 217, 221, 235, 247, 249, 255, 259, 265, 267, 287, 295, 299, 303, 319, 321, 323, 329, 335, 339, 341, 345, 365, 371, 377, 391, 393, 395, 403, ... (sequence A050384 in the OEIS)
