= Žlunice =

- Municipality
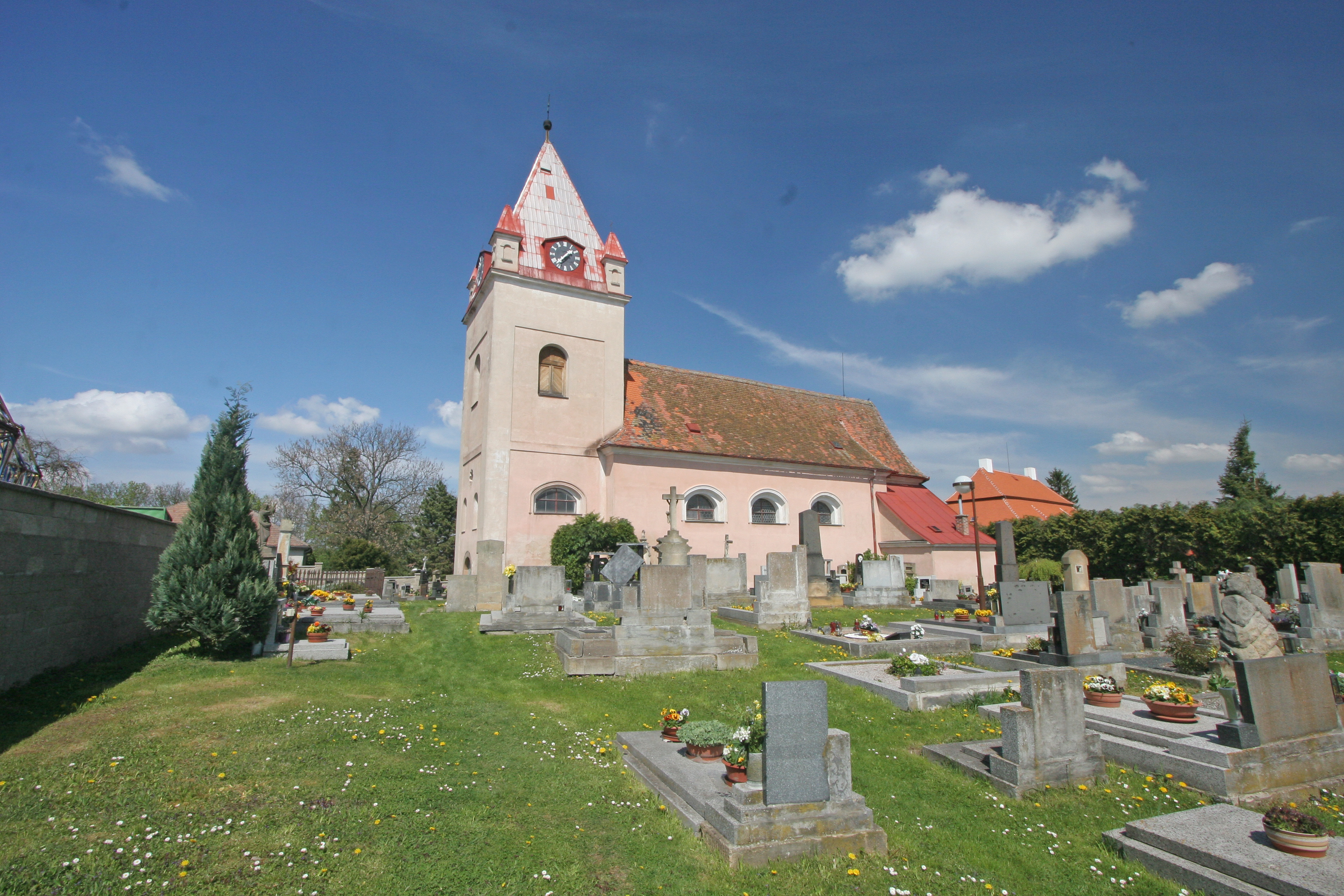
- Church of Saints Peter and Paul

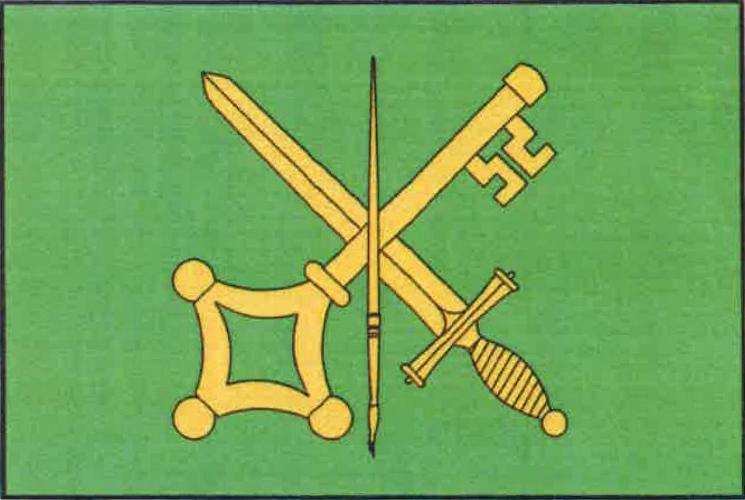
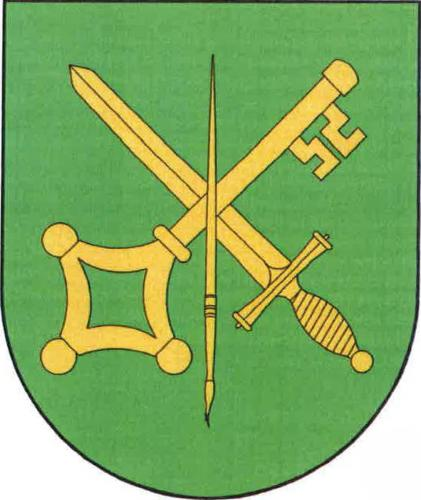
- Flag Coat of arms

- Location in the Czech Republic
- Coordinates: 50°18′8″N 15°22′55″E
- Country: Czech Republic
- Region: Hradec Králové
- District: Jičín
- First mentioned: 1297

Area
  - Total: 7.98 km^{2} (3.08 sq mi)
- Elevation: 263 m (863 ft)

Population (2026-01-01)
  - Total: 258
  - Density: 32.3/km^{2} (83.7/sq mi)
- Time zone: UTC+1 (CET)
  - Summer (DST): UTC+2 (CEST)
- Postal code: 507 34
- Website: www.zlunice.cz

Žlunice is a municipality and village in Jičín District in the Hradec Králové Region of the Czech Republic. It has about 300 inhabitants.

== Demographics ==
Historical population
| Year | Pop. | ±% |
|---|---|---|
| 1869 | 464 | — |
| 1880 | 525 | +13.1% |
| 1890 | 584 | +11.2% |
| 1900 | 536 | −8.2% |
| 1910 | 581 | +8.4% |
| 1921 | 539 | −7.2% |
| 1930 | 541 | +0.4% |
| 1950 | 403 | −25.5% |
| 1961 | 368 | −8.7% |
| 1970 | 328 | −10.9% |
| 1980 | 318 | −3.0% |
| 1991 | 291 | −8.5% |
| 2001 | 275 | −5.5% |
| 2011 | 238 | −13.5% |
| 2021 | 228 | −4.2% |
Source: Censuses

== Notable people ==
- Václav Špála (1885–1946), painter
