= James Henry Weaver =

American mathematician

James Henry Weaver (10 June 1883 in Madison County, Ohio – 7 April 1942 in Franklin County, Ohio) was an American mathematician.

Weaver received B.A. in 1908 from Otterbein College and M.A. in 1911 from Ohio State University. He was a teaching assistant at Ohio State University from 1910 to 1912. He entered the mathematics doctoral program at the University of Pennsylvania in 1912 and graduated there in 1916 with advisor Maurice Babb and thesis Some Extensions of the Work of Pappus and Steiner on Tangent Circles.

From 1912 to 1917 he was head of the mathematics department of West Chester High School in West Chester, Pennsylvania. In 1917, Weaver became an instructor at Ohio State University, advancing to assistant professor in 1920.

Additionally, he was an Invited Speaker of the ICM in 1924.

== Selected publications ==
- Weaver, James H. (1915). "Pappus's solution of the duplication problem". School Science and Mathematics. 15 (3): 216–217. doi:10.1111/j.1949-8594.1915.tb10255.x. (See Pappus of Alexandria.)
- Weaver, James H. (1915). "The trisection problem". School Science and Mathematics. 15 (7): 590–595. doi:10.1111/j.1949-8594.1915.tb10287.x. (See angle trisection.)
- Weaver, James H. (1915). "The five Platonic bodies". The Mathematics Teacher. 7 (3): 86–88. doi:10.5951/MT.7.3.0086. JSTOR 27949868. (See Platonic solid.)
- Weaver, James H. (1916). "The duplication problem". The American Mathematical Monthly. 23 (4): 106–113. doi:10.1080/00029890.1916.11998187. (See doubling the cube.)
- "A geometrical illustration of the form ∞/∞". The American Mathematical Monthly. 23 (5): 181. 1916. doi:10.2307/2974378. JSTOR 2974378.
- Weaver, James H. (1916). "Some theorems from Pappus on isoperimetric figures". School Science and Mathematics. 16 (8): 674–679. doi:10.1111/j.1949-8594.1916.tb01754.x.
- Weaver, J. H. (1916). "Pappus. Introductory paper". Bull. Amer. Math. Soc. 23 (3): 127–135. doi:10.1090/S0002-9904-1916-02895-3.
- Weaver, J. H. (1917). "On foci of conics". Bull. Amer. Math. Soc. 23 (8): 357–365. doi:10.1090/S0002-9904-1917-02961-8.
- Weaver, James H. (1918). "Some algebraic curves". Bull. Amer. Math. Soc. 25 (2): 85–87. doi:10.1090/S0002-9904-1918-03153-4.
- Weaver, J. H. (1920). "Some extensions of the work of Pappus and Steiner on tangent circles". The American Mathematical Monthly. 27 (1): 2–11. doi:10.1080/00029890.1920.11985898. hdl:2027/miun.acv4004.0001.001. (See Steiner chain.)
- Weaver, J. H. (1922). "A generalization of the strophoid". The American Mathematical Monthly. 29 (5): 204–207. doi:10.1080/00029890.1922.11986136. (See strophoid.)
- Weaver, J. H. (1927). "Invariants of a poristic system of triangles". Bull. Amer. Math. Soc. 33 (2): 235–240. doi:10.1090/S0002-9904-1927-04367-1. hdl:2027/osu.32435009112723.
- with R. D. Carmichael: The Calculus. Ginn & Company. 1927.
- with R. D. Carmichael and Lincoln LaPaz: The Calculus (revised ed.). 1937.
- Weaver, J. H. (1937). "An experiment in cooperative teaching". National Mathematics Magazine. 11 (6): 266–273. doi:10.2307/3028180. JSTOR 3028180.
- Weaver, J. H. (1942). "On the cubic of Tschirnhausen". National Mathematics Magazine. 16 (8): 371–374. doi:10.2307/3028893. JSTOR 3028893. (See Tschirnhausen cubic.)
