= Praskačka =

- Municipality
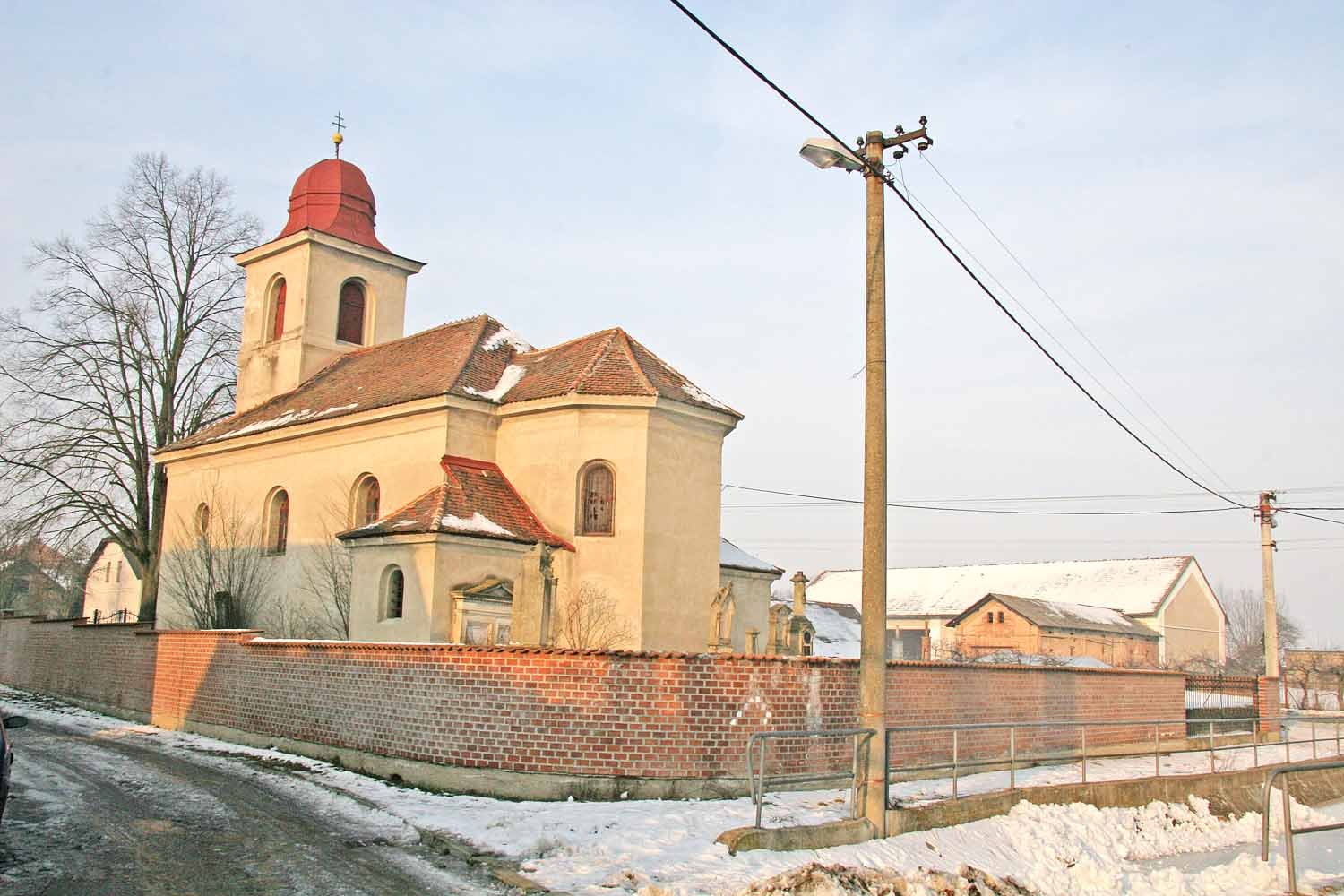
- Church of the Holy Trinity

- Flag Coat of arms

- Location in the Czech Republic
- Coordinates: 50°10′23″N 15°44′22″E
- Country: Czech Republic
- Region: Hradec Králové
- District: Hradec Králové
- First mentioned: 1465

Area
  - Total: 12.89 km^{2} (4.98 sq mi)
- Elevation: 239 m (784 ft)

Population (2026-01-01)
  - Total: 1,147
  - Density: 88.98/km^{2} (230.5/sq mi)
- Time zone: UTC+1 (CET)
  - Summer (DST): UTC+2 (CEST)
- Postal code: 503 33
- Website: www.praskacka.cz

Praskačka is a municipality and village in Hradec Králové District in the Hradec Králové Region of the Czech Republic. It has about 1,100 inhabitants.

== Administrative division ==
Praskačka consists of five municipal parts (in brackets population according to the 2021 census):

- Praskačka (607)
- Krásnice (69)
- Sedlice (249)
- Vlčkovice (131)
- Žižkovec (17)

== Etymology ==
The name is derived from the personal name Praskač, meaning "Praskač's (settlement, homestead)".

== Geography ==
Praskačka is located about 6 kilometres (4 mi) southwest of Hradec Králové. It lies in a flat agricultural landscape in the East Elbe Table.

== History ==
The village was founded shourtly before 1465 and was owned by the monastery in Opatovice. The first written mention of Praskačka is from 1465, when King George of Poděbrady handed over the village to his sons.

== Demographics ==
Historical population

| Year | Pop. | ±% |
|---|---|---|
| 1869 | 1,039 | — |
| 1880 | 1,201 | +15.6% |
| 1890 | 1,225 | +2.0% |
| 1900 | 1,231 | +0.5% |
| 1910 | 1,421 | +15.4% |

| Year | Pop. | ±% |
|---|---|---|
| 1921 | 1,535 | +8.0% |
| 1930 | 1,547 | +0.8% |
| 1950 | 1,209 | −21.8% |
| 1961 | 1,264 | +4.5% |
| 1970 | 1,120 | −11.4% |

| Year | Pop. | ±% |
|---|---|---|
| 1980 | 978 | −12.7% |
| 1991 | 955 | −2.4% |
| 2001 | 914 | −4.3% |
| 2011 | 1,028 | +12.5% |
| 2021 | 1,073 | +4.4% |

Source: Censuses

== Transport ==
The D11 motorway runs through the municipality. Its intersection with the D35 motorway is also located here.

Praskačka is located on the railway line from Hradec Králové to Chlumec nad Cidlinou.

== Culture ==
The municipality is known for its greyhound racing track, which is the only one in the Czech Republic that meets the international standards.

== Sights ==
The main landmark of Praskačka is the Church of the Holy Trinity. It dates from 1848.

== Notable people ==
- Bohumil Kubišta (1884–1918), painter
