= Andrew Granville =

British mathematician (born 1962)

- Born: 7 September 1962 (age 64)
- Education: Trinity College, Cambridge; Queen's University
- Awards: Ribenboim Prize (1999); Chauvenet Prize (2008); Paul R. Halmos – Lester R. Ford Award (2007, 2009); CRM-Fields-PIMS prize (2021)
- Scientific career
- Fields: Mathematics
- Workplaces: Université de Montréal; University of Georgia
- Doctoral advisor: Paulo Ribenboim
- Doctoral students: Ernest S. Croot III
- Website: dms.umontreal.ca/~andrew/

Andrew James Granville (born 7 September 1962) is a British mathematician, working in the field of number theory.

== Education ==
Granville received his Bachelor of Arts (Honours) (1983) and his Certificate of Advanced Studies (Distinction) (1984) from Trinity College, Cambridge University. He received his PhD from Queen's University in 1987 and was inducted into the Royal Society of Canada in 2006.

== Career ==
He has been a faculty member at the Université de Montréal since 2002. Before moving to Montreal he was a mathematics professor at the University of Georgia (UGA) from 1991 until 2002. During his postdoctoral years, he worked at the University of Toronto and the Institute for Advanced Study. He was a section speaker in the 1994 International Congress of Mathematicians together with Carl Pomerance from UGA.

=== Research ===
Granville's work is mainly in number theory, in particular analytic number theory. Along with Carl Pomerance and W. R. (Red) Alford he proved the infinitude of Carmichael numbers in 1994. This proof was based on a conjecture given by Paul Erdős. Beyond Carmichael numbers, Granville has made significant contributions to the distribution of prime numbers, sieve theory, and Diophantine equations. He developed what is known as the "pretentious approach" to analytic number theory, an alternative framework that avoids the use of zeros of L-functions. He has also worked extensively on smooth numbers, exponential sums, and arithmetic geometry. Granville has published more than 160 research papers in mathematical journals.

=== Awards ===
Granville was the first recipient of the Ribenboim Prize of the Canadian Number Theory Association, in 1999. Granville won a Lester R. Ford Award in 2007 and again in 2009. In 2008, he won the Chauvenet Prize for expository writing from the Mathematical Association of America for his paper "It is easy to determine whether a given integer is prime". In 2012, he became a fellow of the American Mathematical Society.

=== Other ===
Andrew Granville, in collaboration with his sister Jennifer Granville, a film writer, wrote Prime Suspects: The Anatomy of Integers and Permutations, a graphic novel that is a "mathematical detective story" and investigates key concepts in mathematics.
