= Slovincian grammar =

Grammar of the Slovincian language

The grammar of the Slovincian language is characterized by a high degree of inflection, a lack of articles, and vowel, consonant, and stress alternations.

Slovincian has an inflectional system mostly inherited from Proto-Slavic, with many innovations.

== Nouns ==
Slovincian has three genders: masculine, feminine, and neuter; three numbers: singular, dual, and plural; and seven cases: nominative, genitive, dative, accusative, instrumental, locative, and vocative.

The vocative is largely replaced by the nominative, but masculine animate singular and a few feminine singular nouns retain it.

The genitive-locative dual has been almost entirely replaced by the plural equivalents, and only few words kept their original forms, e.g.:

- rãˈkʉ ("hand, arm")
- nôˈgʉ ("foot, leg")
- wôˈczʉ ("eye")
- wùˈszʉ ("ear")

The nominative-accusative-vocative dual is found with masculine and feminine nouns and also with monosyllabic neuter stems in stems with non-alternating final consonants ending with ⟨-ô⟩ and in the word ˈjajê ("egg"). The dative-instrumental dual only occurs with monosyllabic stems.

Nouns can either have non-alternating final stem consonants or alternating final stem consonants. The non-alternating consonants are ⟨s, z, sz, cz, ż, dż, rz, l, j⟩, and the alternating consonants are ⟨p, b, f, v, t, d, k, g, ch, gh, m, n, r⟩.

=== Masculine nouns ===
Masculine nouns can end in alternating (⟨p, b, f, v, t, d, k, g, ch, gh, m, n, r⟩) and non-alternating (⟨s, z, sz, ż, rz, l, j⟩) consonants, a consonant ending with ⟨-a⟩ (opa), and alternating consonants ending with ⟨-ë⟩ (kamë). The last group is small and shows an irregular alternation in the non-nominative cases in the singular and all cases in the plural:

- ˈkamë, ˈkamjen ("stone") > ˈkamjenja (gen sg). Compare Kashubian: kam, kamiéń, kamiń.
- ˈplômë, ˈplômjen ("flame"). Compare Kashubian: płom, płomiéń

A few masculine nouns ending in alternating consonants add ⟨j⟩ to the stem when declined. Some nouns with ⟨ej⟩ will add ⟨j⟩, others will not.

- ˈkóń ("horse") > ˈkônja (gen sg)
- ˈmej ("May") > ˈmejjú (gen sg)
- ˈroj ("swarm of bees") > ˈrôjú (gen sg)

Many masculine nouns whose stem ends in ⟨c⟩ and ⟨z⟩ alternate with ⟨cz⟩ and ⟨ż⟩ in the vocative singular.

==== Ending in a consonant ====
Masculine nouns ending in a consonant
	Stressed					Non-stressed				
	Singular		Plural		Dual	Singular		Plural		Dual
	animate	inanimate	virile	nonvirile	Dual	animate	inanimate	virile	nonvirile	Dual
Nominative	-∅		-ˈë, -ˈê (Note: There is no regularity to determine the ending.)		-ˈa	-∅		-ë, -i, -ôwje (Note: Nouns in a velar have ⟨-i⟩ and ⟨-ë⟩ unpredictably, non-velars always have ⟨-ë⟩, except five nouns which admit ⟨-i⟩: ˈchlôp ("man") > ˈchlôpji or ˈchlôpë, ˈkóń ("horse"), ˈknop ("knave"), ˈmaszchôp ("comrade"), ˈkôùp ("swan"). Monosyllabic animate referents often take ⟨-ôwje⟩.)		-a
Genitive	-ˈa, -ˈú (Note: Animate nouns always get ⟨-a⟩. Body parts usually have the ending ⟨-a⟩, coin denominations, trees, and words formed with the suffixes ⟨-ok⟩, ⟨-ëk⟩, ⟨-ik⟩ have ⟨-a⟩. Shrubs, herbs, and substances ⟨-ú⟩.)		-ˈó, -ˈy (Note: Except five plurale tantum nouns ( ˈlëdzë ("people") > ˈlëdzy (genitive plural), ˈpjõdzë ("money") > ˈpjõdzy (genitive plural), ˈswjõtkji ("Pentecost") > ˈswjõtk (genitive plural), ˈjastrë ("Easter") > ˈjastër (genitive plural), ˈgôdë ("Christmas") > ˈgód (genitive plural), nouns admit ⟨-ó⟩ with frequent use of the alternative endings, but -∅ is rare in Kluki. Sometimes ⟨-éj⟩ can be used.)		= pl	-a, -ú		-ó, -∅, -i		= pl
Dative	-ˈú		-ˈóm (Note: There are seven instances of ⟨-ym⟩ and one of ⟨-ˈim⟩, see Lorentz §117,8 and §139,5.)		-ˈôma (Note: The dative/instrumental dual, which only occurs in monosyllabic stems, has the endings ⟨-ôma⟩, ⟨-ema⟩, and ⟨-ma⟩, in one case also ⟨-ëma⟩ (psëma). Of these endings, ⟨-ôma⟩ is widespread throughout the area and is found in both hard and soft stems, ⟨-ema⟩ exists only in Wierzchocino and Stojcino and is restricted to the soft stems; ⟨-ma⟩ occurs in Wierzchocino in a few nouns.)	-ú, -ôjú, -ejú (Note: May get ⟨-ôjú⟩ or ⟨-ejú⟩ in the unstressed dative singular with no certain regularity, except that nouns ending in non-alternating final stem consonants only get ⟨-ejú⟩. Also ⟨-ôwú⟩, ⟨-ewú⟩ in West Slovincian, in Witkowo ⟨-ômú⟩, ⟨-emú⟩, which arose through the influence of the pronominal declension. Forms with ⟨-e-⟩ are much more limited than those formed with ⟨-ô-⟩.)		-óm (-im)		-ôma
Accusative	-ˈa	-∅	-ˈó	-ˈë	-ˈa	-a	-∅	-ó	-ë, -i	-a
Instrumental	-ˈã		-amˈy (-ˈmy, -ˈy) (Note: Except for lëdzˈmy and pjˈõdzmy, nouns prefer ⟨-amy⟩. The other endings are rare, but ⟨-my⟩ generally appears in non-alternating final stem consonants and ⟨-y⟩ in alternating final stem consonants, with exceptions.)		-ˈôma	-ã		-amy (-my, -i)		-ôma
Locative	-ˈú, -ˈê (Note: ⟨-ˈê⟩ occurs for non-syllabic stems.)		-ˈach (-ˈéch) (Note: Generally, ⟨-ach⟩ is the most common endings; ⟨-éch⟩ does not appear in feminine nouns ending in a consonant. ⟨-ich⟩ is only found in a few words.)		= pl	-ú, -ê (Note: After labials and ⟨t, d, n, r⟩ mostly ⟨-e⟩ occurs in monosyllabic and polysyllabic stems.)		-ach (-éch, -ich)		= pl
Vocative	-ˈú (Note: Only the word ˈpjês ("dog") has an attested vocative singular form ˈpsú.)		-ˈë, -ˈê		-ˈa	-ú, -ê (Note: The only regularity is ⟨-ú⟩ for nouns ending in non-alternating final stem consonants with no other regularity able to be established.)		= nom		-a

Examples:

chlôp "man" (personal)
	Singular	Plural	Dual
Nominative	ˈchlôp∅	ˈchlôpji/ˈchlôpë	ˈchlôpa
Genitive	ˈchlôpa	ˈchlôp∅/ˈchlôpó	= pl
Dative	ˈchlôpú/ˈchlôpôjú	ˈchlôpóm	ˈchlôpôma
Accusative	ˈchlôpa	ˈchlôpó	ˈchlôpa
Instrumental	ˈchlôpã	ˈchlôpy/ˈchlôpmy/ˈchlôpamy	ˈchlôpôma
Locative	ˈchlôpjê	ˈchlôpjéch/ˈchlôpach	= pl
Vocative	ˈchlôpjê	= nom	= nom

brat "brother" (personal)
	Singular	Plural	Dual
Nominative	ˈbrat∅	ˈbracë/ˈbratë/ˈbraco	ˈbrata
Genitive	ˈbrata	ˈbrató	= pl
Dative	ˈbratú	ˈbratóm	ˈbratôma/ˈbratma
Accusative	ˈbrata	ˈbrató	ˈbrata
Instrumental	ˈbratã	ˈbraty/ˈbratmy/ˈbratamy	ˈbratôma/ˈbratma
Locative	ˈbracê	ˈbracéch/ˈbratach	= pl
Vocative	ˈbracê	= nom	= nom

brzég "edge, shore" (inanimate)
	Singular	Plural	Dual
Nominative	ˈbrzég∅	ˈbrzêgji	ˈbrzêga
Genitive	ˈbrzêgú	ˈbrzêgó	= pl
Dative	ˈbrzêgú	ˈbrzêgóm	ˈbrzêgôma
Accusative	ˈbrzég∅	ˈbrzêgji	ˈbrzêga
Instrumental	ˈbrzêgã	ˈbrzêgamy	ˈbrzêgôma
Locative	ˈbrzêgú	ˈbrzêgach	= pl
Vocative	= nom	= nom	= nom

wól "ox, steer" (animal)
	Singular	Plural	Dual
Nominative	ˈwól∅	ˈwôlôwje/ˈwôlë	ˈwôla
Genitive	ˈwôla	ˈwôló	= pl
Dative	ˈwôlôjú	ˈwôlóm'	ˈwôlôma/ˈwólma
Accusative	ˈwôla	ˈwôlë	ˈwôla
Instrumental	ˈwôlã	wôlaˈmy/ˈwólmy	ˈwôlôma/ˈwólma
Locative	ˈwôlú	ˈwôlach	= pl
Vocative	ˈwôlê	= nom	= nom

pjês "dog" (masculine animal)
	Singular	Plural	Dual
Nominative	ˈpjês∅	ˈpsë	ˈpsa
Genitive	ˈpsa	ˈpsó	= pl
Dative	ˈpsú	ˈpsóm	ˈpsëma
Accusative	ˈpsa	ˈpsë	ˈpsa
Instrumental	ˈpsã	psˈmy/psaˈmy	ˈpsëma
Locative	ˈpsú	ˈpsach	= pl
Vocative	psˈú	= nom	= nom

lên "flax" (inanimate)
Singular
Nominative	ˈlên∅
Genitive	ˈlnú
Dative	ˈlnú
Accusative	ˈlên∅
Instrumental	ˈlnã
Locative	ˈlnê
Vocative	= nom

ksõdz "(chrisian) priest" (personal)
	Singular	Plural	Dual
Nominative	ˈksõdz∅	ˈksãzɵwje/ˈksãzä	ˈksãza
Genitive	ˈksãza	ksąˈzó	= pl
Dative	ˈksãzú/ˈksãzôjú/ˈksãzejú	ksãˈzóm	ˈksãzôma/ˈksãzema
Accusative	ˈksãza	ksãˈzó	ˈksãza
Instrumental	ˈksãzã	ksãzˈmï/ksãzˈamy	ˈksãzôma/ˈksãzema
Locative	ˈksãzú	ksãˈzach	= pl
Vocative	ˈksãzê	ˈksãza	= nom

kóń "horse" (animal)
	Singular	Plural	Dual
Nominative	ˈkóń∅	ˈkônji/ˈkônjë	ˈkônja
Genitive	ˈkônja	ˈkônjy/ˈkônjó	= pl
Dative	ˈkônjú/ˈkônjejú/ˈkônjôjú	ˈkônjim/ˈkônjóm	ˈkônjema/ˈkônjôma
Accusative	ˈkônja	ˈkônjë	ˈkônja
Instrumental	ˈkônjã	ˈkônjamy/ˈkônjmy/ˈkônjymy	ˈkônjema/ˈkônjôma
Locative	ˈkônjú	ˈkônjich/ˈkônjach	= pl
Vocative	= nom	= nom	= nom

kjêrz "bush, shrub" (inanimate)
	Singular	Plural	Dual
Nominative	ˈkjˈêrz∅	ˈkrzê	ˈkrza
Genitive	ˈkrza	ˈkrzó	= pl
Dative	ˈkrzú	ˈkrzóm	= pl
Accusative	ˈkjêrz∅	ˈkrzê	ˈkrza
Instrumental	ˈkrzã	krzaˈmy	= pl
Locative	ˈkrzú	ˈkrzach	= pl
Vocative	= nom	= nom	= nom

gôsc "guest" (personal)
	Singular	Plural	Dual
Nominative	ˈgôsc∅	ˈgôscë	ˈgôsca
Genitive	ˈgôsca	gôsˈcó	= pl
Dative	ˈgôscú/ˈgôscôjú/ˈgôscejú	gôsˈcóm	ˈgôscma/ˈgôscôma/ˈgôscema
Accusative	ˈgôsca	gôsˈcó	ˈgôsca
Instrumental	ˈgôscã	gôscˈmy/gôscaˈmy	ˈgôscma/ˈgôscôma/ˈgôscema
Locative	ˈgôscú	gôsˈcach	= pl
Vocative	ˈgôscú	= nom	= nom

mjêszczón "burgher" (personal)
	Singular	Plural	Dual
Nominative	ˈmjêszczón∅	ˈmjêszczónjë/ˈmjêszczónjë	ˈmjêszczóna/ˈmjêszczana
Genitive	ˈmjêszczóna/ˈmjêszczana	mjêszˈczón∅/mjêszˈczanó	= pl
Dative	ˈmjêszczónú/ˈmjêszczónôjú	mjêszˈczanóm	= pl
Accusative	ˈmjêszczóna/ˈmjêszczóna	mjêszˈczanó	ˈmjêszczóna/ˈmjêszczana
Instrumental	ˈmjêszczónã/ˈmjêszczanã	mjêszˈczanmy/mjêszˈczanamy/mjêszˈczany	= pl
Locative	ˈmjêszczónjê/ˈmjêszczanjê	mjêszˈczanach	= pl
Vocative	ˈmjêszczónjê/ˈmjêszczanjê	= nom	= nom

kam/kamä/kamjêń "rock, stone" (inanimate)
	Singular	Plural	Dual
Nominative	ˈkam∅/ˈkamä∅/ˈkamjêń∅	ˈkamjênjë	ˈkamjênja
Genitive	ˈkamjênja	kaˈmjênjó	= pl
Dative	ˈkamjênjú	kaˈmjênjóm	= pl
Accusative	ˈkam∅/ˈkamä∅/ˈkamjênj∅	ˈkamjênjë	ˈkamjênja
Instrumental	ˈkamjênjã	kaˈmjenjmy/kaˈmjênjamy	= pl
Locative	ˈkamjênjê/kaˈmjênjú	kaˈmjênjach	= pl
Vocative	= nom	= nom	= nom

dzeń "day" (inanimate)
	Singular	Plural	Dual
Nominative	ˈdzeń∅	ˈdnji	ˈdnja
Genitive	ˈdnja	ˈdnjó/ˈdnjy	= pl
Dative	ˈdnjú	ˈdnjóm	ˈdnjôma
Accusative	ˈdzeń∅	ˈdnji	ˈdnja
Instrumental	ˈdnjã	dnjaˈmy	ˈdnjôma
Locative	ˈdnjú	ˈdnjach	= pl
Vocative	= nom	= nom	= nom

==== Ending with ⟨-a⟩ ====
Masculine nouns ending with ⟨-a⟩ (Note: All masculine nouns ending in ⟨-a⟩ have fixed stress except ˈbùla ("bull") and ˈslëga ("servant").)
	Non-stressed			
	Singular	Plural		Dual
	Singular	virile	nonvirile	Dual
Nominative	-a	-ë, -ôwje (Note: ⟨-ôwje⟩ is for monosyllabic stems, nouns with non-alternating final stem consonants, and several loanwords.)		-a
Genitive	-ë, -i, -a (Note: ⟨-i⟩ after velars, ⟨-ë⟩ after non-velars. Some nouns have ⟨-a⟩ by analogy with some masculine nouns ending in a consonant.)	-ó, -∅ (Note: ⟨-ó⟩ is the most frequent with -∅ appearing without a regular rule.)		= pl
Dative	-ê, -ôjú, -ejú (Note: ⟨-ê⟩ after an alternating consonant, otherwise ⟨-ôjú⟩ or ⟨-ejú⟩ with no predictability as to which.)	-óm (-im) (Note: There are seven instances of ⟨-ym⟩ and one of ⟨-ˈim⟩, see Lorentz §117,8 and §139,5.)		-ôma
Accusative	-ã (Note: Sometimes ⟨-e⟩ (pronounced ⟨-ë⟩ was used, from earlier *-ę.)	-ó, -∅	-ë	-a
Instrumental	-õ, -ã (Note: ⟨-õ⟩ is more common than ⟨-ã⟩, but no rule can be established.)	-amy (-my, -y) (Note: Except for lëdzˈmy and pjˈõdzmy, nouns prefer ⟨-amy⟩. The other endings are rare, but ⟨-my⟩ generally appears in non-alternating final stem consonants and ⟨-y⟩ in alternating final stem consonants, with exceptions.)		-ôma
Locative	-y -ú, -ê (Note: ⟨-ê⟩ after alternating consonant, ⟨-ú⟩ after non-alternting consonants. ⟨-y⟩ can be shown in nouns ending in ⟨-ola⟩, but potentially only for feminine nouns.)	-ach (-éch, -ich) (Note: Generally, ⟨-ach⟩ is the most common endings; ⟨-éch⟩ does not appear in feminine nouns ending in a consonant. ⟨-ich⟩ is only found in a few words.)		= pl
Vocative	-ú, -ë	= nom		-a

Examples:

opa "monkey" (animal)
	Singular	Plural	Dual
Nominative	ˈopa	ˈopë	ˈopa
Genitive	ˈopë/ˈopa	ˈopó	= pl
Dative	ˈopjê/ˈopôjú	ˈopóm	ˈopôma
Accusative	ˈopã	ˈopë	ˈopa
Instrumental	ˈopõ	ˈopamy/ˈopmy	ˈopôma
Locative	ˈopjê	ˈopach	= pl
Vocative	ˈopjê	= nom	= nom

bùla "bull" (animal)
	Singular	Plural	Dual
Nominative	ˈbùla	ˈbùlë	ˈbùla
Genitive	ˈbùlë	bùˈló	= pl
Dative	ˈbùlôjú	bùˈlóm	ˈbùlôma
Accusative	ˈbùlã	ˈbùlë	ˈbùla
Instrumental	ˈbùlõ/ˈbùlã	bùlaˈmy	ˈbùlôma
Locative	bùˈlú	bùˈlach	= pl
Vocative	ˈbùlú	= nom	= nom

twórca "creator" (personal)
	Singular	Plural	Dual
Nominative	ˈtwórca	ˈtwórcôwje	ˈtwórca
Genitive	ˈtwórcë/ˈtwórca	ˈtwórcó	= pl
Dative	ˈtwórcôjú/ˈtwórcejú	ˈtwórcóm	ˈtwórcôma
Accusative	ˈtwórcã	ˈtwórcä	ˈtwórca
Instrumental	ˈtwórcõ/ˈtwórcã	ˈtwórcamy	ˈtwórcôma
Locative	ˈtwórcú	ˈtwórcach	= pl
Vocative	ˈtwórcú	= nom	= nom

nożênja "bridegroom" (personal)
	Singular	Plural	Dual
Nominative	noˈżênja	ˈnożênjë	= pl
Genitive	noˈżênjë	noˈżênjó	= pl
Dative	ˈnożênjejú/ˈnożênjôjú	noˈżênjóm	= pl
Accusative	ˈnożênjã	noˈżênjó	= pl
Instrumental	ˈnożênjõ	noˈżênjamy	= pl
Locative	noˈżênjú	noˈżênjach	= pl
Vocative	noˈżênja	= nom	= nom

=== Feminine nouns ===
Feminine nouns can end in a consonant, ⟨-a⟩, and ⟨-o⟩.

Feminine nouns ending in non-alternating consonants always add ⟨-j-⟩ to non-nominative cases except the genitive plural, which takes -∅.

- ˈdlon ("open palm"), ˈdlonjë (genitive singular), ˈdlon (genitive plural)

A few feminine nouns end in ⟨-i⟩, ⟨-ëw⟩ (⟨-ew⟩), and ⟨-wja⟩. There are two nouns that end in ⟨-ë⟩ and two nouns that end in ⟨-é⟩:

- ˈcérkwji, ˈcérkjëw, ˈcérkwja ("church") (Compare Kashubian: cerkew, cerczew, cerkwiô)
- polˈnôcë ("midnight")
- ˈkrë (alternatively ˈkrev) ("blood")
- brëˈvjé ("eyebrow")
- ɡôspôˈdënjé ("female host")

It can be noticed that both masculine and feminine nouns can end in a consonant with ⟨-a⟩ ending. Masculine nouns ending in ⟨-a⟩ always refer to a male being and female nouns ending in ⟨-a⟩ a female being; the one exception is ˈslëga ("servant") and nouns ending in ⟨-ola⟩, which can refer to a person of either gender.

==== With stem ending in an alternating consonant with ⟨-a⟩ ending ====
Feminine nouns' stem ending in ⟨p, b, f, w, t, d, k, g, ch, gh, m, n, r⟩ with ⟨-a⟩ ending
	Stressed			Non-stressed		
	Singular	Plural	Dual	Singular	Plural	Dual
Nominative	-ˈa	-ˈë	-ˈê	-a	-ë, -i (Note: ⟨-i⟩ after velars, ⟨-ë⟩ after non-velars.)	-ê
Genitive	-ˈë	-ˈó, -∅ (Note: -∅ is the most frequent with ⟨-ó⟩ appearing without a regular rule.)	= pl	-ë, -i	-ó, -∅	= pl
Dative	-ˈê	-ˈóm (Note: There are seven instances of ⟨-ym⟩ and one of ⟨-ˈim⟩, see Lorentz §117,8 and §139,5.)	= pl	-ê	-óm (-im)	-óma
Accusative	-ˈã	-ˈë	-ˈê	-ã (Note: Sometimes ⟨-e⟩ (pronounced ⟨-ë⟩ was used, from earlier *-ę.)	-ë, -i	-ê
Instrumental	-ˈõ	-aˈmy (-ˈmy, -ˈy) (Note: Except for lëdzˈmy and pjˈõdzmy, nouns prefer ⟨-amy⟩. The other endings are rare, but ⟨-my⟩ generally appears in non-alternating final stem consonants and ⟨-y⟩ in alternating final stem consonants, with exceptions.)	= pl	-õ	-amy (-my, -y)	-óma
Locative	-ˈê	-ˈach (-ˈéch) (Note: Generally, ⟨-ach⟩ is the most common endings; ⟨-éch⟩ does not appear in feminine nouns ending in a consonant. ⟨-ich⟩ is only found in a few words.)	= pl	-ë	-ach (-éch, -ich)	= pl
Vocative	= nom	= nom	-ˈê	-ô (Note: -ɵ/ only occurs in a few nouns.)	= nom	-ê

Examples:

rëba "fish"
	Singular	Plural	Dual
Nominative	ˈrëba	ˈrëbë	ˈrëbjê
Genitive	ˈrëbë	ˈryb∅/ˈrëbó	= pl
Dative	ˈrëbjê	ˈrëbóm	ˈrëbóma
Accusative	ˈrëbã	ˈrëbë	ˈrëbjê
Instrumental	ˈrëbõ	ˈrëbamy/ˈrëby	ˈrëbóma
Locative	ˈrëbjê	ˈrëbach	= pl
Vocative	= nom	= nom	= nom

rãka "hand; arm"
	Singular	Plural	Dual
Nominative	ˈrãka	ˈrãkji	ˈrãcê
Genitive	ˈrãkji	ˈrãk∅/ˈrãkó	rãˈkú
Dative	ˈrãcê	rãˈkóm	ˈrãkóma
Accusative	ˈrãkã	ˈrãkji	ˈrãcê
Instrumental	rãˈkõ	rãkaˈmy	ˈrãkóma
Locative	ˈrãcê	rãˈkach	= pl
Vocative	= nom	= nom	= nom

skra "spark"
	Singular	Plural	Dual
Nominative	ˈskra	ˈskrë	ˈskrzê
Genitive	ˈskrë	ˈskê∅r/ˈskró	= pl
Dative	ˈskrzê	ˈskróm	= pl
Accusative	ˈskrã	ˈskrë	ˈskrzê
Instrumental	ˈskrõ	skraˈmy	= pl
Locative	ˈskrzê	ˈskrach	= pl
Vocative	= nom	= nom	= nom

==== With stem ending in a non-alternating consonant with ⟨-a⟩ ending ====
Feminine nouns' stems ending in a ⟨s, z, sz, ż, rz, l, j⟩ with ⟨-a⟩ ending
	Stressed			Non-stressed		
	Singular	Plural	Dual	Singular	Plural	Dual
Nominative	-ˈa	-ˈê, -ˈë (Note: ⟨-ˈë⟩ occurs after ⟨s⟩ and ⟨z⟩, otherwise ⟨-ˈê⟩/.)	-ˈy	-a	-ë	-y
Genitive	-ˈê, -ˈë	-ˈó, -∅, -ˈy (Note: -∅ is the most frequent with ⟨-ó⟩ and ⟨-y⟩ appearing without a regular rule. Only non-syllabic stems have ⟨-ˈy⟩.)	= pl	-ë	-∅, -y	= pl
Dative	-ˈy	-ˈóm (Note: There are seven instances of ⟨-ym⟩ and one of ⟨-ˈim⟩, see Lorentz §117,8 and §139,5.)	= pl	-y	-óm (-im)	-óma
Accusative	-ˈã	-ˈê, -ˈë	-ˈy	-ã	-ë	-y
Instrumental	-ˈõ	-aˈmy (-ˈmy, -ˈy) (Note: Except for lëdzˈmy and pjˈõdzmy, nouns prefer ⟨-amy⟩. The other endings are rare, but ⟨-my⟩ generally appears in non-alternating final stem consonants and ⟨-y⟩ in alternating final stem consonants, with exceptions.)	= pl	-õ	-amy (-my, -y)	-óma
Locative	-ˈi	-ˈach (-ˈéch) (Note: Generally, ⟨-ach⟩ is the most common endings; ⟨-éch⟩ does not appear in feminine nouns ending in a consonant. ⟨-ich⟩ is only found in a few words.)	= pl	-i	-ach (-éch, -ich)	= pl
Vocative	= nom	= nom	-ˈy	= nom	= nom	-y

Examples:

tãcza "thundercloud"
	Singular	Plural	Dual
Nominative	ˈtãcza	ˈtãczë	ˈtãczy
Genitive	ˈtãczë	ˈtãczy/ˈtãcz∅	= pl
Dative	ˈtãczy	ˈtãczóm	ˈtãczóma
Accusative	ˈtãczã	ˈtãczë	ˈtãczy
Instrumental	ˈtãczõ	ˈtãczamy/ˈtãczmy	ˈtãczóma
Locative	ˈtãczy	ˈtãczach	= pl
Vocative	= nom	= nom	= nom

zêmja "earth; soil"
	Singular	Plural	Dual
Nominative	ˈzêmja	ˈzêmjë	ˈzêmjy
Genitive	ˈzêmjë	ˈzem∅/zêˈmjó	= pl
Dative	ˈzêmjy	zêˈmjóm	ˈzêmjóma
Accusative	ˈzêmjã	ˈzêmjë	ˈzêmjy
Instrumental	zeˈmjõ	zêmjaˈmy	ˈzêmjóma
Locative	ˈzêmjy	zêˈmjach	= pl
Vocative	= nom	= nom	= nom

sla "breastplate (for a horse)"
	Singular	Plural	Dual
Nominative	ˈsla	ˈslê	ˈsly
Genitive	ˈslê	ˈsêl∅	= pl
Dative	ˈsly	ˈslóm	= pl
Accusative	ˈslã	ˈslê	ˈsly
Instrumental	ˈslõ	slaˈmy	= pl
Locative	ˈsly	ˈslach	= pl
Vocative	= nom	= nom	= nom

kôsa "scythe"
	Singular	Plural	Dual
Nominative	ˈkôsa	ˈkôsë	ˈkôsy
Genitive	ˈkôsë	ˈkôs∅/ˈkôsy	= pl
Dative	ˈkôsy	ˈkôsóm	ˈkôsóma
Accusative	ˈkôsã	ˈkôsë	ˈkôsy
Instrumental	ˈkôsõ	ˈkôsamy	ˈkôsóma
Locative	ˈkôsy	ˈkôsach	= pl
Vocative	= nom	= nom	= nom

lza "tear"
	Singular	Plural	Dual
Nominative	ˈlza	ˈlzë	ˈlzy
Genitive	ˈlzë	ˈzêl∅/ˈlzy	= pl
Dative	ˈlzy	ˈlzóm	= pl
Accusative	ˈlzã	ˈlzë	ˈlzy
Instrumental	ˈlzõ	lzaˈmy	= pl
Locative	ˈlzy	ˈlzach	= pl
Vocative	= nom	= nom	= nom

mac/macêrz "mother"
	Singular	Plural	Dual
Nominative	ˈmac∅/ˈmacêrza	ˈmacêrzë	ˈmacêrzy
Genitive	ˈmacêrzë	maˈcéř∅/macêˈřyn	= pl
Dative	ˈmacêrzy	maˈcêrzóm	= pl
Accusative	ˈmac∅/ˈmacêrzã	ˈmacêrzë	ˈmacerzy
Instrumental	maˈcêrzõ	maˈcêrzmy/maˈcêrzamy	= pl
Locative	maˈcêrzy	maˈcêrzach	= pl
Vocative	= nom	= nom	= nom

==== Ending with ⟨-o⟩ ====
Feminine nouns ending in ⟨-o⟩
	Stressed			Non-stressed		
	Singular	Plural	Dual	Singular	Plural	Dual
Nominative	-ˈo (Note: brëˈwjé ("eyebrow") belongs to this declension.)	-ˈé	-ˈy	-o	-ë	-y
Genitive	-ˈé	-ˈy	= pl	-é	-y, -∅ (Note: Only two nouns have -∅: ˈmjéz from ˈmjêzo ("field divide") and ˈrzóz from ˈrzôzo ("evening glow").)	= pl
Dative	-ˈy	-óm (Note: There are seven instances of ⟨-ym⟩ and one of ⟨-ˈim⟩, see Lorentz §117,8 and §139,5.)	-óˈma	-y	-óm (-ym)	-óma
Accusative	-ˈõ	-ˈé	-ˈy	-õ	-ë	-y
Instrumental	-ˈõ	-aˈmy (-ˈmy, -ˈy) (Note: Except for lëdzˈmy and pjˈõdzmy, nouns prefer ⟨-amy⟩. The other endings are rare, but ⟨-my⟩ generally appears in non-alternating final stem consonants and ⟨-y⟩ in alternating final stem consonants, with exceptions.)	-óˈma	-õ	-amy (-my, -y)	-óma
Locative	-ˈi	-ˈach (-ˈéch) (Note: Generally, ⟨-ach⟩ is the most common endings; ⟨-éch⟩ does not appear in feminine nouns ending in a consonant. ⟨-ich⟩ is only found in a few words.)	= pl	-i	-ach (-éch, -ich)	= pl
Vocative	= nom	= nom	-ˈy	= nom	= nom	-y

Examples:

cenjo "shade, shadow"
	Singular	Plural	Dual
Nominative	ceˈnjo	ceˈnjé	ceˈnjy
Genitive	ceˈnjé	ceˈnjy	= pl
Dative	ceˈnjy	ceˈnjóm	= pl
Accusative	ceˈnjõ	ceˈnjé	ceˈnjy
Instrumental	ceˈnjõ	cenjaˈmy	= pl
Locative	ceˈnjy	ceˈnjach	= pl
Vocative	= nom	= nom	= nom

mjêzo "balk"
	Singular	Plural	Dual
Nominative	ˈmjêzo	ˈmjêzë	ˈmjêzy
Genitive	ˈmjêzé	ˈmjêz∅/ˈmjêzy	= pl
Dative	ˈmjêzy	ˈmjêzóm	ˈmjêzóma
Accusative	ˈmjêzõ	ˈmjêzë	ˈmjêzy
Instrumental	ˈmjêzõ	ˈmjêzamy/mjezˈmy	ˈmjêzóma
Locative	ˈmjêzy	ˈmjêzach	= pl
Vocative	= nom	= nom	= nom

==== Ending in a consonant ====
Feminine nouns ending in a consonant
	Stressed			Non-stressed		
	Singular	Plural	Dual	Singular	Plural	Dual
Nominative	-∅	-ˈë	-ˈy	-∅, -i, -a (Note: A few nouns show alternations with ⟨-a⟩ and ⟨-i⟩.)	-ë	-y
Genitive	-ˈë, -ˈê (Note: ⟨-ˈê⟩ only for krëˈwjê from krë ("blood"); Rudnicki sometimes gives [i].)	-ˈi, -∅	= pl	-ë	-i, -ó, -∅, -ew (Note: ⟨-y⟩ is the most common, the other endings occur unpredictably. ⟨-ew⟩ is rare.)	= pl
Dative	-ˈy	-óm (Note: There are seven instances of -ym⟩ and one of -ˈim⟩, see Lorentz §117,8 and §139,5.)	= pl (Note: Feminine nouns in this case are unattested; there is one exception for masculine nouns: ˈpsˈma from ˈpjês ("dog").)	-y	-óm (-ym)	-óma, -ma
Accusative	-∅	-ˈë	-ˈy	-∅	-ë	-y
Instrumental	-ˈõ	-aˈmy (-ˈmy, -ˈy) (Note: Except for lëdzˈmy and pjˈõdzmy, nouns prefer ⟨-amy⟩. The other endings are rare, but ⟨-my⟩ generally appears in non-alternating final stem consonants and ⟨-y⟩ in alternating final stem consonants, with exceptions.)	= pl	-õ	-amy (-my, -y)	-óma, -ma
Locative	-ˈy	-ˈach (-ˈéch) (Note: Generally, ⟨-ach⟩ is the most common endings; ⟨-éch⟩ does not appear in feminine nouns ending in a consonant. ⟨-ich⟩ is only found in a few words.)	= pl	-y, -ë (Note: Lorentz in §139 says that polysyllabic stems ending in ⟨-n⟩ or ⟨-ôsc⟩ usually take ⟨-ë⟩. This is not the case in Kluki.)	-ach (-éch, -ych)	= pl
Vocative	= nom	= nom	-ˈy	= nom	= nom	-y

Examples:

wôs "axis"
	Singular	Plural	Dual
Nominative	ˈwôs∅	ˈwôsë	ˈwôsy
Genitive	ˈwôsë	wôˈsy/ˈwôs∅	= pl
Dative	ˈwôsy	wôˈsóm	ˈwôsma
Accusative	ˈwôs∅	ˈwôsë	ˈwôsy
Instrumental	ˈwôsõ	wôsˈmy	ˈwôsma
Locative	ˈwôsy	wôˈsach	= pl
Vocative	= nom	= nom	= nom

mësz "mouse"
	Singular	Plural	Dual
Nominative	ˈmësz∅	ˈmëszë	ˈmëszy
Genitive	ˈmëszë	ˈmëszy	= pl
Dative	ˈmëszy	ˈmëszim/ˈmëszóm	ˈmëszma/ˈmëszóma
Accusative	ˈmësz∅	ˈmëszë	ˈmëszy
Instrumental	ˈmëszõ	ˈmëszmy/ˈmëszamy	ˈmëszma/ˈmëszóma
Locative	ˈmëszy	ˈmëszach	= pl
Vocative	= nom	= nom	= nom

chôrôsc "sickness, illness"
	Singular	Plural	Dual
Nominative	ˈchôrôsc∅	ˈchôrôscë	ˈchôrôscy
Genitive	ˈchôrôscë	chôˈrôsc∅/chôˈrôscy	= pl
Dative	ˈchôrôscy	chôˈrôscóm	= pl
Accusative	ˈchôrôsc∅	ˈchôrôscë	chôrôscy
Instrumental	chôˈrôscõ	chôˈrôscmy/chôˈrôscamy	= pl
Locative	chôˈrôscy/ˈchôrôscë	chôˈrôscach	= pl
Vocative	= nom	= nom	= nom

wjês "village"
	Singular	Plural	Dual
Nominative	ˈwjês∅	ˈwsë	ˈwsy
Genitive	ˈwsë	ˈwsy	= pl
Dative	ˈwsy	ˈwsóm	= pl
Accusative	ˈwjês∅	ˈwsë	ˈwsy
Instrumental	ˈwsõ	wsaˈmi	= pl
Locative	ˈwsy/ˈwsë	ˈwsach	= pl
Vocative	= nom	= nom	= nom

cérkji/cérkjew "church"
	Singular	Plural	Dual
Nominative	ˈcérkji∅/ˈcérkjew∅	ˈcérkwjë	ˈcérkwjy
Genitive	ˈcérkwjë	ˈcérkew∅/ˈcérkwjy/ˈcérkwjó	= pl
Dative	ˈcérkwjy	ˈcérkwjóm	ˈcérkwjóma
Accusative	ˈcérki∅/ˈcérkew∅	ˈcérkwjë	ˈcérkwjy
Instrumental	ˈcérkwjõ	ˈcérkwjamy	ˈcérkwjóma
Locative	ˈcérkwjy	ˈcérkwjach	= pl
Vocative	= nom	= nom	= nom

krë, krew "blood"
Singular
Nominative	ˈkrë, ˈkrew∅
Genitive	krëˈwjê
Dative	krëˈwjy
Accusative	ˈkrë, ˈkrew∅
Instrumental	krëˈwjõ
Locative	krëˈwjy
Vocative	= nom

=== Neuter nouns ===
Neuter nouns can end in a ⟨-ô⟩, a non-alternating consonant with ⟨-é⟩ ending, a consonant with ⟨-ã⟩ ending, and non-alternating consonants with ⟨-ê⟩ ending, the last two groups being sub-classes of the first.

==== Ending with ⟨-o⟩ (⟨-ã⟩ or ⟨-ê⟩) ====
Neuter nouns ending in ⟨-ô⟩ (or ⟨-ã⟩ or ⟨-ê⟩)
	Stressed			Non-stressed		
	Singular	Plural	Dual	Singular	Plural	Dual
Nominative	-ˈô	-ˈa	-ˈê	-ô, -ê (Note: ⟨-ê⟩ except ˈmôrzê ("sea"), ˈspôlê ("community, collective"), ˈksénjê ("shed"), ˈslôncê ("Sun"), and ˈpôùnjê ("midday") (and its derivatives such as przyˈpôùnjê ("forenoon")), which all have the alternate ending ⟨-ô⟩.)	-a	-ê
Genitive	-ˈa	-∅, -ˈó (Note: -∅ is the most common. ˈmôrzê ("sea") and nouns ending in ⟨-stwô⟩ have ⟨-ó⟩. môˈrzy is attested alongside môˈrzó.)	= pl	-a	-∅, -ó	= pl
Dative	-ˈú	-ˈóm (Note: There are seven instances of -ym⟩ and one of -ˈim⟩, see Lorentz §117,8 and §139,5.)	-ˈôma (Note: The dative/instrumental dual, which only occurs in monosyllabic stems, has the endings ⟨-ôma⟩, ⟨-ema⟩, and ⟨-ma⟩, in one case also ⟨-ëma⟩ (psëma). Of these endings, ⟨-ôma⟩ is widespread throughout the area and is found in both hard and soft stems, ⟨-ema⟩ exists only in Wierzchocino and Stojcino and is restricted to the soft stems; ⟨-ma⟩ occurs in Wierzchocino in a few nouns.)	-ú	-óm	-ôma
Accusative	-ˈô	-ˈa	-ˈê	-ô, -ê	-a	-ê
Instrumental	-ˈã	-amˈy (-ˈmy, -ˈy) (Note: Except for lëdzˈmy and pjˈõdzmy, nouns prefer ⟨-amy⟩. The other endings are rare, but ⟨-my⟩ generally appears in non-alternating final stem consonants and ⟨-y⟩ in alternating final stem consonants, with exceptions.)	-ˈôma	-ã	-amy (-my, -y)	-ôma
Locative	-ˈú, -ˈê (Note: ⟨-ˈê⟩ occurs for non-syllabic stems.)	-ˈach (-ˈéch) (Note: Generally, ⟨-ach⟩ is the most common endings; ⟨-éch⟩ does not appear in feminine nouns ending in a consonant. ⟨-ich⟩ is only found in a few words.)	= pl	-ê	-ach (-éch, -ich)	= pl
Vocative	= pl	= pl	-ˈê	= pl	= pl	-ê

Examples:

latô "summer"
	Singular	Plural	Dual
Nominative	ˈlatô	ˈlata	ˈlêcê
Genitive	ˈlata	ˈlat∅	= pl
Dative	ˈlatú	ˈlatóm	ˈlatóma
Accusative	ˈlatô	ˈlata	ˈlêcê
Instrumental	ˈlatã	ˈlaty/ˈlatamy	ˈlatóma
Locative	ˈlêcê	ˈlatach/ˈlêcéch	= pl
Vocative	= nom	= nom	= nom

kôlô "wheel"
	Singular	Plural	Dual
Nominative	ˈkôlô	ˈkôla	ˈkôlê
Genitive	ˈkôla	ˈkól∅	= pl
Dative	ˈkôlú	kôˈlóm	ˈkôlóma
Accusative	ˈkôlô	ˈkôla	ˈkôlê
Instrumental	ˈkôlã	kôlaˈmy	ˈkôlóma
Locative	kôˈlú	kôˈlach	= pl
Vocative	= nom	= nom	= nom

kôlanô "knee"
	Singular	Plural	Dual
Nominative	ˈkôlanô	kôˈlana	= pl
Genitive	ˈkôlana	kôˈlón∅/kôˈlanó	= pl
Dative	ˈkôlanú	kôˈlanóm	= pl
Accusative	ˈkôlanô	kôˈlana	= pl
Instrumental	ˈkôlanã	kôˈlanmy/kôˈlanamy	= pl
Locative	ˈkôlanjê	kôˈlanjéch/kôˈlanach	= pl
Vocative	= nom	= nom	= nom

krô "calf (of the leg)"
	Singular	Plural	Dual
Nominative	ˈkrô	ˈkrë	ˈkrzê
Genitive	ˈkrë	ˈkjêr∅/ˈkró	= pl
Dative	ˈkrú	ˈkróm	ˈkrôma
Accusative	ˈkrô	ˈkrë	ˈkrzê
Instrumental	ˈkrã	ˈkramy	ˈkrôma
Locative	ˈkrzê	ˈkrzéch/ˈkrach	= pl
Vocative	= nom	= nom	= nom

pôlô/pôlê "field"
	Singular	Plural	Dual
Nominative	ˈpôlô/ˈpôlê	ˈpôla	= pl
Genitive	ˈpôla	ˈpól∅	= pl
Dative	ˈpôlú	pôˈlóm	= pl
Accusative	ˈpôlô/ˈpôlê	ˈpôla	= pl
Instrumental	ˈpôlã	pôlˈmy/pôˈlamy	= pl
Locative	ˈpôlê/pôˈlú	pôˈlach	= pl
Vocative	= nom	= nom	= nom

môrzê "sea"
	Singular	Plural	Dual
Nominative	ˈmôrzê	ˈmôrza	= pl
Genitive	ˈmôrza	môˈrzy/môˈrzó	= pl
Dative	ˈmôrzú	môˈrzóm	= pl
Accusative	ˈmôrzê	ˈmôrza	= pl
Instrumental	ˈmôrzã	môrzˈmy/môrzaˈmy	= pl
Locative	ˈmôrzê/môˈrzú	môˈrzach	= pl
Vocative	= nom	= nom	= nom

jajê "egg"
	Singular	Plural	Dual
Nominative	ˈjajê/ˈjajô	ˈjaja	ˈjajê
Genitive	ˈjaja	ˈjôj	= pl
Dative	ˈjajú	jaˈjóm	= pl
Accusative	ˈjajê/ˈjajô	ˈjaja	ˈjajê
Instrumental	ˈjajã	jajˈmy	= pl
Locative	jaˈjú	jaˈjach/jaˈjéch	= pl
Vocative	= nom	= nom	= nom

remjã "arm"
	Singular	Plural	Dual
Nominative	ˈremjã	reˈmjônjê	= pl
Genitive	ˈremjênja	reˈmjón∅/reˈmjônjó	= pl
Dative	ˈremjênjú	reˈmjônjóm	= pl
Accusative	ˈremjã	reˈmjônjê	= pl
Instrumental	ˈremjênjã	reˈmjônjamy/reˈmjônjmy	= pl
Locative	ˈremjênjê/reˈmjênjú	reˈmjônjach	= pl
Vocative	= nom	= nom	= nom

cêlã "calf (young cow)"
	Singular	Plural	Dual
Nominative	ˈcêlã	cêˈląta	= pl
Genitive	ˈcêlëca	ˈcêląt∅/cêˈlątó	= pl
Dative	ˈcêlëcú	cêˈlątóm	= pl
Accusative	ˈcêlã	cêˈląta	= pl
Instrumental	ˈcêlëcã	cêˈlątamy/cêˈlątmy/cêˈląty	= pl
Locative	ˈcêlëcú	cêˈlątach	= pl
Vocative	= nom	= nom	= nom

jagnjã "lamb"
	Singular	Plural	Dual
Nominative	ˈjagnjã	jagˈnjąta	= pl
Genitive	ˈjagnjica	ˈjagnjąt∅/jagˈnjątó	= pl
Dative	ˈjagnjicú	jagˈnjątóm	= pl
Accusative	ˈjagnjã	jagˈnjąta	= pl
Instrumental	ˈjagnjicã	jagˈnjątamy/jagˈnjątmy/jagˈnjąty	= pl
Locative	ˈjagnjicú	jagˈnjątach	= pl
Vocative	= nom	= nom	= nom

==== With stem ending in a non-alternating consonant with ⟨-é⟩ ending ====
Neuter nouns' stems ending in ⟨s, z, sz, ż, rz, l, j⟩ with ⟨-é⟩ ending
	Stressed		
	Singular	Plural	Dual
Nominative	-é	-o, -é, -a (Note: ⟨-a⟩ is rare. ⟨-o⟩ and ⟨-é⟩ are alternative endings.)	= nom
Genitive	-o	-∅, -ó (Note: The most common ending is ⟨-ó⟩; a few nouns have only -∅. Nouns ending in ⟨-anjé⟩ admit both endings.)	= nom
Dative	-ú	-óm (-im) (Note: There are seven instances of -ym⟩ and one of -ˈim⟩, see Lorentz §117,8 and §139,5.)	= nom
Accusative	-é	-o, -é	= nom
Instrumental	-ym	-amy (-my, -y) (Note: Except for lëdzˈmy and pjˈõdzmy, nouns prefer ⟨-amy⟩. The other endings are rare, but ⟨-my⟩ generally appears in non-alternating final stem consonants and ⟨-y⟩ in alternating final stem consonants, with exceptions.)	= nom
Locative	-ú, -im (Note: ⟨-im⟩ is the most common, but see Rudnicki §187 for additional forms such as [-em] and [-ėm].)	= nom	
Vocative	= pl	= pl	= pl

kôzané "sermon"
	Singular	Plural	Dual
Nominative	koˈzanjé	koˈzanjo/koˈzanjé	= pl
Genitive	koˈzanjo	koˈzónj∅/koˈzanjó	= pl
Dative	koˈzanjú	koˈzanjóm	= pl
Accusative	koˈzanjé	koˈzanjé/koˈzanjo	= pl
Instrumental	koˈzanjim	koˈzanjmy/koˈzanjamy	= pl
Locative	koˈzanjú/koˈzanjim	koˈzanjach	= pl
Vocative	= nom	= nom	= nom

vjesêlé "wedding"
	Singular	Plural	Dual
Nominative	wjeˈsêlé	wjeˈsôla	= pl
Genitive	wjeˈsêlo	wjeˈsól∅	= pl
Dative	wjeˈsêlú	wjeˈsôlóm	= pl
Accusative	wjeˈsêlé	wjeˈsôla	= pl
Instrumental	wjeˈsêlim	wjeˈsôlamy	= pl
Locative	wjeˈsêlú/wjeˈsêlim	wjeˈsôlach	= pl
Vocative	= nom	= nom	= nom

=== Consonant alternations ===
With one exception, soft stem-final consonants remain unchanged; hard stem-final consonants, however, have a number of alternations:

- ⟨k⟩ || ⟨kj⟩ || ⟨c⟩ || ⟨cz⟩
- ⟨g⟩ || ⟨gj⟩ || ⟨z⟩ || ⟨ż⟩
- ⟨zg⟩ || ⟨zgj⟩ || ⟨zdz⟩ || —
- ⟨ch⟩ || ⟨chj⟩ || ⟨sz⟩ || ⟨sz⟩
- ⟨gh⟩ || ⟨j⟩ || ⟨z⟩ or ⟨ż⟩ || —
- ⟨t⟩ || ⟨c⟩
- ⟨d⟩ || ⟨dz⟩
- ⟨n⟩ || ⟨nj⟩
- ⟨m⟩ || ⟨mj⟩
- ⟨p⟩ || ⟨pj⟩
- ⟨b⟩ || ⟨bj⟩
- ⟨f⟩ || ⟨fj⟩
- ⟨w⟩ || ⟨wj⟩
- ⟨r⟩ || ⟨rz⟩
- ⟨c⟩ || ⟨cz⟩
- ⟨z⟩ || ⟨ż⟩
- ⟨c⟩ || ⟨cz⟩
- ⟨z⟩ || ⟨ż⟩

The alternations ⟨k⟩||⟨kj⟩, ⟨g⟩||⟨gj⟩, ⟨zg⟩||⟨zgj⟩, ⟨ch⟩||⟨chj⟩, ⟨gh⟩||⟨j⟩ occur:

- In masculine nouns ending in ⟨p, b, f, w, t, d, k, g, ch, gh, m, n, r⟩ with:
1. the nominative-accusative plural ending ⟨-i⟩:
  ˈmjêch ("sack") > ˈmjêchji (nominative-accusative plural);
2. the instrumental plural ending ⟨-y⟩:
  ˈftoch ("bird") > ˈftochjy (instrumental plural).
- In masculine nouns' stem ending in ⟨p, b, f, w, t, d, k, g, ch, gh, m, n, r⟩ with nominative ending ⟨-a⟩ with the genitive singular ending ⟨-i⟩:
  ˈslëga ("servant") > ˈslëgji (geneitive singular).
- In feminine nouns' stem ending in ⟨p, b, f, w, t, d, k, g, ch, gh, m, n, r⟩ with nominative ending ⟨-a⟩ with the genitive singular/nominative-accusative plural ending ⟨-i⟩:
  ˈmùcha ("fly (insect)") > ˈmùchji (genitive singular/nominative-accusative plural).
- In feminine nouns' stem ending in ⟨p, b, f, w, t, d, k, g, ch, gh, m, n, r⟩ with nominative ending ⟨-o⟩ with the genitive singular ending ⟨-é⟩ and the locative singular ending ⟨-y⟩:
  Szwétsko ("Sweden") > Szvétskjé (genitive singular) > Szwétskjy (locative singular).
- In neuter nouns' stem ending in ⟨p, b, f, w, t, d, k, g, ch, gh, m, n, r⟩ with nominative ending ⟨-ô⟩ with the instrumental plural ending ⟨-y⟩. Only ⟨k⟩||⟨kj⟩ is attested:

- ˈjabkô ("apple") > ˈjabkjy (instrumental plural).

The alternations ⟨k⟩||⟨c⟩, ⟨g⟩||⟨z⟩, ⟨zg⟩||⟨zdz⟩, ⟨ch⟩||⟨sz⟩, ⟨gh⟩||⟨z⟩/⟨ż⟩, ⟨t⟩||⟨c⟩, ⟨d⟩||⟨dz⟩, ⟨n⟩||⟨nj⟩, ⟨m⟩||⟨mj⟩, p⟩||⟨pj⟩, ⟨b⟩||⟨bj⟩, ⟨f⟩||⟨fj⟩, ⟨w⟩||⟨wj⟩, ⟨r⟩||⟨rz⟩, ⟨c⟩||⟨cz⟩, ⟨z⟩||⟨ż⟩ occur:

- In masculine nouns ending in ⟨p, b, f, w, t, d, k, g, ch, gh, m, n, r⟩ with:
1. the nominative-accusative plural ending ⟨-i⟩ for three nouns:
  ˈchlôp ("man") ˈchlôpji (nominative-accusative plural);
  ˈkop ("knave") ˈknopji (nominative-accusative plural);
  ˈmaszchôp ("comrade; partner") > ˈmaszchôpji (nominative-accusative plural);
2. the locative singular ending ⟨-ê⟩;
  ˈsnjég ("snow") > ˈsnjêzê (locative singular);
3. the nominative plural ending ⟨-ë⟩;
  ˈsnjég ("snow") > ˈsnjêzê (nominative plural);
4. the locative plural ending ⟨-éch⟩;
  ˈkwjat ("flower") > kwjeˈcéch (locative plural).
- In masculine nouns ending in ⟨p, b, f, w, t, d, k, g, ch, gh, m, n, r⟩+⟨-a⟩ with the dative and locative singular ending ⟨-ê⟩:
  ˈopa ("monkey; ape") > ˈopjê (dative-locative singular).
- In feminine nouns' stem ending in ⟨p, b, f, w, t, d, k, g, ch, gh, m, n, r⟩ with ending ⟨-a⟩ with:
1. the dative-locative singular/nominative-accusative dual ending ⟨-ˈê⟩ or ⟨ê⟩. Here ⟨gh⟩ can alternate with ⟨z⟩ as well as ⟨ż⟩:
  ˈrãka ("hand; arm") > ˈrãcê (dative-locative singular/nominative-accusative dual);
  ˈmogha ("stomach, maw") > ˈmozê or ˈmożê (dative-locative singular);
  ˈrejgha ("row") > ˈrejzê or ˈrejżê (dative-locative singular);
  ˈrózga ("branch, twig") > ˈrózdzê (dative-locative singular);
2. the locative plural ending ⟨-éch⟩:
  ˈborzda ("furrow") > ˈbarzdzéch (locative plural).
- In neuter nouns' stem ending in ⟨p, b, f, w, t, d, k, g, ch, gh, m, n, r⟩ with ending ⟨-ô⟩ with:
1. the locative singular/nominative-accusative dual ending ⟨-ê⟩;
  ˈlatô ("summer") > ˈlêcê (locative singular/nominative-accusative dual);
2. the locative plural ending ⟨-éch⟩:
  ˈgnjozdô ("nest") > ˈgnjozdzéch (locative plural).

The alternations ⟨k⟩||⟨cz⟩, ⟨g⟩||⟨ż⟩, ⟨ch⟩||⟨sz⟩, ⟨t⟩||⟨c⟩, ⟨d⟩||⟨dz⟩, ⟨n⟩||⟨nj⟩, ⟨m⟩||⟨mj⟩, ⟨p⟩||⟨pj⟩, ⟨b⟩||⟨bj⟩, ⟨f⟩||⟨fj⟩, ⟨w⟩||⟨wj⟩, ⟨r⟩||⟨rz⟩, ⟨c⟩||⟨cz⟩, ⟨z⟩||⟨ż⟩ occur:

- In masculine nouns ending in ⟨p, b, f, w, t, d, k, g, ch, gh, m, n, r⟩ with the vocative singular ending ⟨-ê⟩:
  ˈczlôwjek ("person") > ˈczlôwjecê (vocative singular);
  kaˈmrot ("comrade") > kaˈmrocê (vocative singular).
- In masculine nouns ending in ⟨p, b, f, w, t, d, k, g, ch, gh, m, n, r⟩+⟨-a⟩ with the vocative singular ending ⟨-ê⟩;
  ˈopa ("monkey; ape") > ˈopjê (vocative singular).

The alternations ⟨c⟩||cz and ⟨z⟩||⟨ż⟩ occurs:

- In masculine nouns ending in ⟨-c⟩ and ⟨-z⟩ with the vocative singular ending ⟨-ê⟩;
  ˈchlôpc ("serf; male servant") > ˈchlôpczê (vocative singular).

There also exists a number of isolated, irregular alternations, usually in common words.

=== Noun vowel alternations ===
There are three types of vowel alternations.

The first alternation affects the last syllable of the stem.

This alternation can put vowels into three groups:

1. ⟨o, ó, é, y, ú, õ, ˈôù, ˈôj, ŭ⟩
2. ⟨a, ô, e, ë, i, ã, ê, aj⟩ / ⟨ôˈù, ej, ĭ⟩
3. ⟨ôˈi, au, ùej, ă, ŏ, ĕ, ù̆⟩

The vowels ⟨o, ó, é, y, ú, õ, ˈôù, ˈôj, ŭ⟩ in the nominative singular of an alternating stem always alternate with the vowels ⟨a, ô, e, ë, i, ã, ê, aj⟩ / ⟨ôˈù, ej, ĭ⟩. The vowels ⟨a, ô, e, ë, i, ã, ê, aj⟩ / ⟨ôˈù, ej, ĭ⟩ in the nominative singular of an alternating stem always alternate with ⟨o, ó, é y, ú, õ, ˈôù, ˈôj, ŭ⟩, but ⟨ôˈù, ej, ĭ⟩ are not attested in the nominative singular of an alternating stem. The vowels ⟨ôˈi, au, ùej, ă, ŏ, ĕ, ù̆⟩ never alternate.

Group 1~2

- ⟨o~a⟩, ⟨o~ô⟩: ⟨o~a⟩ sometimes applies to the basic phoneme /ɔ/ and sometimes to the archiphoneme /ɔ/ when unstressed before ⟨r, rz, i, (j)⟩. In all other positions the archiphoneme ⟨o⟩ alternates with ⟨ô⟩.
  ˈczod ("smoke, fume") > ˈczadú (genitive singular)
  ˈwˈãgorz ("eel") > ˈwãgôrza (genitive singular) but wãˈgórz (genitive plural)
  ˈgwjozda ("star") > ˈgwjazdõ (instrumental singular)
  ˈpôkoj ("calm") > ˈpôkôjú (genitive singular) > pôˈkôjú (locative singular)
- ⟨ó~a⟩, ⟨ó~ô⟩: ⟨ó⟩ can alternate between both ⟨a⟩ and ⟨ô⟩ when before a nasal, before other consonants ⟨ó⟩ alternates with ⟨ô⟩. ⟨ó~a⟩ can also be found in the suffix ⟨-ón⟩ indicating inhabitants, in feminine equivalents of these nouns with mobile stress, and in three individual nouns. Outside of these cases, ⟨o~a⟩ is not to be found, and the alternation will be ⟨ó~ô⟩ before a nasal consonant. Stressed ⟨ˈó⟩ is the archiphoneme of /ˈo/ and /ˈɔ/ before ⟨j⟩.
  ˈbóg ("god") > ˈbôga (genitive singular)
  ˈmjêszczón ("urbanite") > ˈmjêszczana (genitive singular)
  ˈjablónka ("apple tree") > jaˈblônkã (instrumental singular)
- ⟨é~ê⟩ and ⟨é~ˈej⟩: an alternation of ⟨é~ˈe⟩ is unattested. There is one instance of ⟨ˈéj~ˈê⟩ attested. /é~ˈej/ occurs in loanwords with fixed stress before ⟨j⟩ in stem-final position.
  drëˈżéjn ("pith in the wood") > drëˈżênja (genitive singular)
  ˈbjég ("run") > ˈbjêgú (genitive singular) > ˈbjegú (locative singular)
  (loanword with fixed stress before ⟨j⟩ in stem-final position) aˈléj ("alley") > aˈlejjú (genitive singular)
- ⟨y~ë⟩, ⟨y~i⟩: ⟨y~ë⟩ after ⟨cz, dż, j⟩ and ⟨y~i⟩ after all other consonants.
  ˈżmjija ("snake") > żmjyˈjõ (instrumental singular)
  ˈczin ("deed") > ˈczynú (genitive singular)
  ˈżid ("Jew") > ˈżëda (genitive singular)
- ⟨ú~ë⟩, ⟨ü~ù⟩: ⟨ü~ù⟩ after ⟨p, b, w, m, n, j, k, ch, g, cz⟩, ⟨ú~ë⟩ after all other consonants.
  ˈdlúg ("debt") > ˈdlëga (genitive singular)
  ˈjúcha ("soup") > jùˈchõ (instrumental singular)
- ⟨õ~ã⟩ alternate regularly.
  ˈdõb ("oak tree") > ˈdãba (genitive singular)
- ⟨ŭ~ĭ⟩ appears only in polysyllabic feminine loanwords ending in ⟨-ŭnga⟩ with mobile stress:
  ˈreknŭnga ("reckoning") > rekˈnĭngõ (instrumental singular)
- ⟨ˈôù(w)~a⟩ /ˈôù~ôˈù/: The alternation ⟨ˈôù(w)~a⟩ occurs before /l, (v)/ or in open final syllables. ⟨ˈôù~ôˈù⟩ occurs before all other consonants.
  ˈstôùw or ˈstôù ("pond") > staˈwú (genitive singular) > staˈwó (genitive plural)
  ˈczôùn > ("small inland boat") > ˈczôùn (genitive singular)

Group 2~1:

- ⟨a~o⟩, ⟨a~ó⟩, ⟨a~ˈôù(w)⟩: ⟨a~ó⟩ before nasals. ⟨a~ˈôù⟩ before ⟨l, w⟩. ⟨a~o⟩ in all other cases.
  ˈscana ("wall") > ˈscón (genitive plural)
  ˈstrawa ("meal") > ˈstrôù(v) (genitive plural)
  ˈskala ("rock") > ˈskôùl (genitive plural)
  ˈbaba ("old woman") > ˈbob (genitive plural)
- ⟨ô~ó⟩ alternate regularly.
  ˈgrônô ("squat, crouch") > ˈgrón (genitive plural)
  ˈkrôwa ("cow") > ˈkró(w) (genitive plural)
- ⟨e, ê~é⟩ see ⟨é~e, ê⟩.
- ⟨ë~y⟩, ⟨ë~ú⟩, ⟨ë~ó⟩: ⟨ë~y⟩ and ⟨ë~ú⟩ is regular but as to which alternation occurs is unpredictable; however, ⟨ë~ú⟩ alternate only in four words. Nouns ending in ⟨-ˈëna, -ëna⟩ always show ⟨ë~y⟩. ⟨ë~ó⟩ is a unique exception with one example, being the remnant of a set of alternations ⟨ë~ó⟩, ⟨ë~é⟩, ⟨ù~ó⟩, ⟨i~é⟩. which is still productive in verb stems when followed by /l/ but otherwise obsolete in the noun.
  ˈszczêżëla ("scale (of an animal)") szczeˈzúl (genitive plural)
  ˈsztënja ("hour") > ˈsztún (genitive plural)
  ˈsztrëga ("brook, stream") > ˈsztrúg (genitive plural)
  ˈlëba ("type of weaving rush") > ˈlúb (genitive plural)
  szëja ("neck") > szyj (genitive plural)
  ˈstrzëna ("duct, pipe, tube") > ˈstrzyn (genitive plural)
  ˈstrzëżënë ("cord, string") (plurale tantum) > ˈstrzëżyn (genitive plural)
  ˈghrëla (fire poker) > ˈghrol (genitive plural)
- ⟨i~y⟩ alternate regularly.
  ˈszczinë ("urine") (plurale tantum) > ˈszczyn (genitive plural)
- ⟨ù~ú⟩ alternate regularly.
  ˈbùda ("booth, stall") > ˈbúd (genitive plural)
- ⟨ã~õ⟩ alternate regularly.
  ˈlãba ("sheaf") > ˈlõb (genitive plural)
- ⟨aj~ˈôj⟩ alternate regularly.
  ˈjajô ("egg") > ˈjôj (genitive plural) > jajˈmy (instrumental plural)

Nouns with fleeting vowels do not count the fleeting vowel for the syllable count of the stem.

One can generally predict when alternations take place for each inflection type knowing the gender, number of syllables of the stem, last stem vowel, the voicedness of the final consonant (⟨-ôù⟩ is considered voiced), and whether stress is mobile or stressed.

⟨o, ó, é, y, ú, õ, ˈôù, ˈôj, ŭ⟩ ~ ⟨a, ô, e, ë, i, ã, ê, aj⟩ / ⟨ôˈù, ej, ĭ⟩ alternations occurs for masculine mono-syllabic and polysyllabic stems ending in a consonant or in a consonant ending with ⟨-a⟩ and feminine mono-syllabic and polysyllabic stems ending in a consonant in the genitive, dative, accusative animate, instrumental, and vocative singular and in all the plural (except accusative animate) and dual forms. If the genitive plural is -∅, then ⟨o, ó, é, y, ú, õ, ˈôù, ˈôj, ŭ⟩ are present. Nouns ending in a consonant alternate only if the vowel in the final stem syllable is ⟨o, ó, é, y, ú, õ, ˈôù, ˈôj, ŭ⟩.

- Masculine nouns ending in a voiced consonant with a monosyllabic stem containing ⟨o, ó, é, y, ú, õ, ˈôù, ˈôj, ŭ⟩ and having fixed or mobile stress have this alternation. Such nouns containing ⟨a, ô, e, ë, i, ã, ê, aj⟩ / ⟨ôˈù, ej, ĭ⟩ or voiceless consonant do not have alternations.
  (fixed) ˈgrod ("hail") > ˈgradú (genitive singular)
  (mobile) ˈbóg ("god") > ˈbôga (genitive singular)
- Two exceptions exist for monosyllabic masculine nouns ending in a voiceless consonant with fixed stress:
  ˈtónc ("dance") has both this alternation and no alternation: ˈtanca or ˈtónc (genitive singular)
  ˈslúp ("post, pillar") can have either fixed or mobile stress, and as a result, either this alternation or no alternation: ˈslúpjéch or slëˈpjéch (locative plural).
- Masculine nouns ending in a voiced consonant with polysyllabic stems containing ⟨o, ó, é, y, ú, õ, ˈôù, ˈôj, ŭ⟩ and having fixed or mobile stress also alternate this way. Such nouns containing ⟨a, ô, e, ë, i, ã, ê, aj⟩ / ⟨ôˈù, ej, ĭ⟩ or voiceless consonant do not have alternations or that are loanwords do not have alternations. Nouns of mobile stress ending in ⟨-orz⟩ have this type or another (below) if there is ⟨a, ô, e, ë, i, ã, ê, aj⟩ / ⟨ôˈù, ej, ĭ⟩ in the syllable preceding the final stem syllable with ⟨o, ó, é, y, ú, õ, ˈôù, ˈôj, ŭ⟩. Nouns ending in ⟨-ón⟩ may optionally alternate.
  (fixed native word) ˈvëchód ("exit") > ˈvëchôda (genitive singular)
  (fixed loanword) ˈknŭrhon ("gurnard") > ˈknŭrhona (genitive singular)
  (mobile) ˈkõkól ("corncockle") > ˈkõkôlú (genitive singular)
  (mobile ⟨-orz⟩) ˈpjêkorz ("baker") > ˈpjêkarza (genitive singular), ˈpjêkorza (genitive singular) and ˈpjêkarzú (locative singular)
- Feminine nouns ending in a voiced consonants with a monosyllabic stem containing ⟨o, ó, é, y, ú, õ, ˈôù, ˈôj, ŭ⟩ vowel and having fixed stress typically have no alternation but can have this alternation, the same kind of nouns with mobile stress have this alternation. Such nouns containing ⟨a, ô, e, ë, i, ã, ê, aj⟩ / ⟨ôˈù, ej, ĭ⟩ or voiceless consonant do not have alternations.
  (fixed or mobile) ˈdrob ("ladder") > ˈdrobjõ or draˈbjõ (instrumental singular)
  (mobile) ˈscyrz ("beast of burden") > ˈscërza (genitive singular)
- Feminine nouns ending in a voiced consonants with a polysyllabic stem containing ⟨o, ó, é, y, ú, õ, ˈôù, ˈôj, ŭ⟩ and having fixed or mobile stress have this alternation. Such nouns containing ⟨a, ô, e, ë, i, ã, ê, aj⟩ / ⟨ôˈù, ej, ĭ⟩ or voiceless consonant do not have alternations.
  ˈgalõz ("gallows") > ˈgalãzë or gaˈlãzy (genitive singular) > gaˈlõz (genitive plural)

⟨o, ó, é, y, ú, õ, ˈôù, ˈôj, ŭ⟩ ~ ⟨a, ô, e, ë, i, ã, ê, aj⟩ / ⟨ôˈù, ej, ĭ⟩ alternate for neuter polysyllabic stems ending in a consonant ending with ⟨-ô⟩ in no singular forms and in all plural and dual forms.

- Monosyllabic neuter nouns ending in a voiced consonant ending in ⟨-ô⟩ nouns whose stem has + ⟨a, ô, e, ë, i, ã, ê, aj⟩ / ⟨ôˈù, ej, ĭ⟩ of mobile stress show an alternation of ⟨a, ô, e, ë, i, ã, ê, aj⟩ / ⟨ôˈù, ej, ĭ⟩ ~ ⟨o, ó, é, y, ú, õ, ˈôù, ˈôj, ŭ⟩. Only one example can be found.
  ˈcalô ("body") > ˈcôùl (genitive plural)
- Polysyllabic neuter nouns ending in a voiceless consonant ending with ⟨-kô⟩ nouns whose stem contains ⟨o, ó, é, y, ú, õ, ˈôù, ˈôj, ŭ⟩ with mobile stress show this alternation except those ending in ⟨-yszkô⟩ and ⟨-ùszkô⟩.
  ˈcêlõtkô ("calf") > cêˈlãtka (nominative plural)
- Mobile polysyllabic neuter nouns ending in a consonant ending with ⟨-ô⟩ stems with this alternation show another alternation in the locative singular in ⟨-ú⟩, but stress can change this.
  ˈdôbitczõtkô ("small animal") > dôbitˈczãtka (nominative plural) but > ˈdôbitczõtkú (locative singular)
  ˈslónyszkô ("sun") > slóˈnyszka (nominative plural)

⟨o, ó, é, y, ú, õ, ˈôù, ˈôj, ŭ⟩ ~ ⟨a, ô, e, ë, i, ã, ê, aj⟩ / ⟨ôˈù, ej, ĭ⟩ alternations occurs for feminine monosyllabic stems ending in a consonant anding with ⟨-a⟩ in the instrumental singular, genitive, dative, instrumental, and locative plurals, and not in the plural. If the genitive plural is -∅, then ⟨o, ó, é, y, ú, õ, ˈôù, ˈôj, ŭ⟩ are present.

- Nouns of mobile stress ending in ⟨-orz⟩ have this type or another (above) if there is ⟨a, ô, e, ë, i, ã, ê, aj⟩ / ⟨ôˈù, ej, ĭ⟩ in the syllable preceding the final stem syllable with ⟨o, ó, é, y, ú, õ, ˈôù, ˈôj, ŭ⟩.
  (mobile ⟨-orz⟩) ˈpjêkorz ("baker") > ˈpjêkarza (genitive singular), ˈpjêkorza (genitive singular) and pjêˈkarzú (locative singular)
- Diminutives ending in ⟨-ork⟩, ⟨-ólk⟩, and ⟨-ónk⟩ have this alternation.
  ˈkoczork ("drake (male duck)") > koˈczôrkú (locative singular)
- Monosyllabic feminine stems ending in a consonant ending with ⟨-a⟩ + containing ⟨o, ó, é, y, ú, õ, ˈôù, ˈôj, ŭ⟩ in the stem with mobile stress have this alternation. Such nouns with fixed stress do not.
  (voiced) ˈgwjozda ("star") > gwjazˈdõ (instrumental singular)
  (voiceless) ˈmõka ("flour") > mãˈkõ (instrumental singular)
- Polysyllabic feminine nouns ending in a voiced consonant+/-a/ borrowed nouns whose stems contain ⟨a, ô, e, ë, i, ã, ê, aj⟩ / ⟨ôˈù, ej, ĭ⟩ with mobile stress have this alternation. Such native words have none.

- (native) ˈprzyvoga ("overweight") > ˈprzyvogõ (instrumental singular)
- (loanword) ˈlodŭnga ("load") > laˈdy̆ngõ (instrumental singular), but the alternative nominative singular ending in -ynga shows no alternation.

⟨a, ô, e, ë, i, ã, ê, aj⟩ / ⟨ôˈù, ej, ĭ⟩ ~ ⟨o, ó, é, y, ú, õ, ˈôù, ˈôj, ŭ⟩ alternations occur for feminine monosyllabic stems ending in a consonant plus ending ⟨-a⟩ and in a consonant with ending ⟨-o⟩, polysyllabic stems ending in a consonant with ending ⟨-a⟩, and neuter stems ending in a consonant with ending ⟨-ô⟩ monosyllabic and polysyllabic stems only in the genitive plural unless the genitive plural is -∅.

- Monosyllabic native feminine C+⟨-a⟩ nouns whose stems end in a voiced consonant + ⟨a ô e ë i ã ê aj⟩|ôˈù ej ĭ⟩ with fixed stress have this alternation. Such borrowed words do not.
  (fixed native) ˈbaba ("old woman") > ˈbob (genitive plural)
  (fixed loanword) ˈflagha ("flag") > ˈflagh (genitive plural)
- Monosyllabic borrowed feminine stems ending in a voiced consonant+⟨-a⟩ nouns and contain ⟨a, ô, e, ë, i, ã, ê, aj⟩ / ⟨ôˈù, ej, ĭ⟩ with mobile stress unpredictably have this alternation or none. Such native words alternate.
  (mobile loanword with alternation) ˈkara ("cart") > ˈkor (genitive plural)
  (mobile loanword without alternation) ˈszëfla ("shovel") > szëˈfel (genitive plural)
  (mobile native) ˈglôwa ("head") > ˈglów (genitive plural)
- Polysyllabic feminine nouns ending in a voiced consonant+⟨-a⟩ nouns whose stems contain ⟨a, ô, e, ë, i, ã, ê, aj⟩ / ⟨ôˈù, ej, ĭ⟩ with mobile stress have this alternation.
- Feminine nouns with this alternation that form the genitive plural with -∅ and formed with an infix show no alternation.
  ˈwarna ("crow") > ˈworn but also ˈwarën (genitive plural)
- Monosyllabic neuter nouns ending in a voiced consonant+⟨-ô⟩ whose stem contain ⟨o, ó, é, y, ú, õ, ˈôù, ˈôj, ŭ⟩ with mobile stress show this alternation. One such noun can be found.
  ˈgównô ("shit") > ˈgôwna (nominative plural) > gôˈwjên (genitive plural)
- Polysyllabic neuter nouns ending in a voiceless consonant with ending ⟨-ô⟩ nouns whose stem contains ⟨o, ó, é, y, ú, õ, ˈôù, ˈôj, ŭ⟩ with mobile stress show this alternation including those ending in ⟨-iszkô⟩ and ⟨-ùszkô⟩.
  slˈónyszkô ("sun") > slónˈyszka (nominative plural)
- Polysyllabic neuter nouns ending in a voiced consonant ending ⟨-ô⟩ nouns whose stem contains ⟨a, ô, e, ë, i, ã, ê, aj⟩ / ⟨ôˈù, ej, ĭ⟩ with mobile stress show this alternation.
  ˈwrzêcônô ("spindle") > wrzêˈcôna (nominative plural)
- In the genitive plural of neuter nouns formed with -∅ and an infix of with this type, alternation takes place.
  ˈdôbrô ("good") > dôˈber (genitive plural)
  ˈkarnô ("(Shaar)") > ˈkarën (genitive plural)

The second type of alternations is not automatic and is rare, applying to a few dozen nouns. ⟨ˈa, a; ˈô, ô; ó, o⟩ may change into ⟨ˈê⟩ when stressed and ⟨ê⟩ when unstressed in native monosyllabic or polysyllabic stems.

This alternation may occur:

1. In masculine nouns ending with ⟨ˈa, a; ˈô, ô; ó, o⟩ + ⟨s, z, t, d, n, r, l⟩ in the locative-vocative singular and nominative plural ⟨-ê⟩ and in the locative plural ⟨-ˈéch⟩ or ⟨-éch⟩.
  ˈjanjól ("angel") > ˈjanjelê (locative singular-nominative plural)
  ˈjasón ("ash tree") > ˈjasênje (locative singular) > jaˈsênjéch (nominative plural)
2. In feminine nouns' stems ending in ⟨t, d, n, r⟩ ening with ⟨-a⟩ in the dative and locative singular and the nominative and accusative dual in ⟨-ê⟩
  ˈkôbjôra ("coltsfoot") > ˈkôbjerzê (dative-locative singular)
  ˈmjara ("measure") > ˈmjêrzê (dative-locative singular/nominative-accusative dual)
3. In neuter nouns' stems ending in ⟨t, d, n, r⟩ ending witih ⟨-ô⟩ and neuter nouns in ⟨l⟩ ending with ⟨-ô⟩ in the locative singular and the nominative and accusative dual in ⟨-ê⟩ and in the locative plural in ⟨-ˈéch⟩ or ⟨-éch⟩.
  ˈcalô ("body") > ˈcêlê (locative singular/nominative-accusative dual) > cêˈléch (locative plural)

This alternation does not even occur regularly in all the cases mentioned and may occur in nouns with mono- or polysyllabic stems of both mobile and fixed stress patterns and also depends on whether other alternations occur in these nouns.

The last alternation involves inserting ⟨ˈe, e, ë, ˈê, ˈej⟩ between the last consonants of a stem before -∅. The alternation itself it not predictable, but the inserted vowel is.

- Masculine non-syllabic stems ending in a consonant have a fleeting infix in the nominative singular of ⟨ˈej~∅⟩ if a ⟨-j⟩ is added to the stem, otherwise ⟨ˈê~∅⟩.
  (with inserted -j) ˈdzeń ("day") > ˈdnja (genitive singular)
  ˈlên ("flax") > ˈlnú (genitive singular)
- Feminine non-syllabic stems ending in a consonant have a fleeting infix in the nominative singular of ⟨ˈe~∅⟩ before /ż, sz/, otherwise ⟨ê~∅⟩.
  ˈreż ("rye") > ˈrżë (genitive singular)
  ˈwjês ("village") > ˈwsë (genitive singular)
- Feminine non-syllabic stems ending in a consonant ending with ⟨-a⟩ have a fleeting infix ⟨-ê-⟩ and -∅ in the genitive plural:
  ˈskra ("spark") > ˈskjêr or ˈskró (genitive plural)
- Neuter non-syllabic stems in a consonant ending with ⟨-ô⟩ have a fleeting infix ⟨-ê-⟩ and /∅/ in the genitive plural:
  ˈkrô ("calf of one's leg") > ˈkjêr or ˈkró (genitive plural)
- Masculine mono- and polysyllabic stems have unstressed ⟨-ë⟩ (before ⟨n⟩ and also ⟨e⟩), stressed ⟨ê⟩ after velars plus ⟨j⟩, ⟨ˈe⟩ in all other cases in the nominative singular and the genitive plural and the genitive plural in -∅.
  ˈbãbël ("drum") > ˈbãbla (gen. sing.) > ˈbãbel (genitive plural)

but:

ˈserszël ("hornet") > ˈserszela (genitive singular)

- Feminine mono- and polysyllabic stems ending in a consonant ending with ⟨-a⟩ show ∅~vowel/diphthong alternation in the genitive plural in ⟨∅⟩: ⟨∅~ˈê⟩, ⟨∅~ˈê⟩ (unstressed) after velars plus ⟨j⟩; ⟨∅~ˈe⟩ (stressed), ⟨∅~e, ê⟩ (unstressed) after other consonants (⟨e⟩ only sometimes before final ⟨w⟩ or ⟨nj⟩. However, many such words do not show here this third type of alternation, mostly loanwords. There also nouns with the first type which in the genitive plural either show ⟨a, ô, e, ë, y, ã, e, aj⟩ / ⟨ôˈù, ej, ĭ⟩ with an inserted vowel or ⟨o, ó, é, y, ú, õ, ˈôù, ˈôj, ŭ⟩ without one, no matter whether the vowel in the nominative singular is ⟨o, ó, é, y, ú, õ, ˈôù, ˈôj, ŭ⟩ or ⟨a, ô, e, ë, y, ã, e, aj⟩ / ⟨ôˈù, ej, ĭ⟩:
  ˈjêgla ("needle") > jêˈgjêl (genitive plural)

but:

ˈpalma ("palm") > ˈpalm (genitive plural)

but:

ˈwarna ("crow") > ˈwarên but also ˈworn (genitive plural)
ˈborna ("harrow") > baˈren but also ˈborn (genitive plural)

- Several feminine monosyllabic stems ending in ⟨-ew⟩ or ⟨-ëw⟩ in the nominative singular show ⟨e, ë~∅⟩ alternation in all other cases except the genitive plural in -∅.
  ˈcérkjëw ("church") > ˈcérkjwë (genitive singular) > ˈcérkjëw (genitive plural)
- Neuter mono- and polysyllabic stems ending in a consonant ending with ⟨-ô⟩ have unstressed ⟨-ê⟩ (/ɛ/ or /ə/ before ⟨n⟩), stressed ⟨ê⟩ after velars and ⟨j⟩, ⟨ˈe⟩ after other consonants in the genitive plural ending in ⟨-∅⟩.
  ˈkrôsna ("loom") (plurale tantum) > ˈkrôsên (genitive plural)
  ˈżêbrô ("rib") > żeˈber (genitive plural)

A few nouns show isolated cases of other alternations.

=== Noun stress alternations ===
Slovincian nouns can have either fixed or mobile stress. Nouns with fixed stress keep the stress on the stem, unless the stress is on the end, in which case the stress will always be on the last syllable. If a vowel is inserted in the genitive plural formed with -∅, then that vowel will automatically get the stress. All non-syllabic stems with fixed stress have in the dative and instrumental dual a stress shift to the first syllable of the inflectional suffix.

Nouns with mobile stress can shift it in three ways.

Some shift it right in the plural and the dual.

- The stress always shifts from its original position in the nominative singular to the final syllable of the ending for non-syllabic and monosyllabic stems. In polysyllabic stems the stress shifts to the last syllabic of the stem.

- ˈrãka ("hand, arm") > rãˈkõ (instrumental singular) > rãkaˈmy (instrumental plural)

- The locative singular ending ⟨-ú⟩ causes an automatic shift here.
- Sometimes no stress shift occurs in the genitive plural constructed with -∅ here.

Nouns with this type of shift include:

- Neuter polysyllabic stems ending in a consonant+⟨-ô⟩. These nouns can also have fixed stress.
- Neuter polysyllabic stems ending in a consonant+⟨-ã⟩.

Some shift it right in the genitive, dative, instrumental, and locative plural.

- The stress always shifts from its original position in the nominative singular to the final syllable of the ending for non-syllabic and monosyllabic stems. In polysyllabic stems the stress shifts to the last syllabic of the stem.

- ˈrãka ("hand, arm") > rãˈkõ (instrumental singular) > rãkaˈmy (instrumental plural)

- All here feminine nouns automatically shift the stress in the instrumental singular.
- The locative singular ending ⟨-ú⟩ causes an automatic shift here.
- The locative singular ending ⟨-i⟩ causes an automatic shift in feminine nouns with a polysyllabic stem ending in a consonant or ending in a consonant +⟨-a⟩.

Nouns with this type of shift include:

- Masculine monosyllabic stems ending in a consonant or in a consonant+⟨-a⟩, of which there are two examples. These nouns can also have fixed stress.
- Masculine polysyllabic stems ending in a consonant. These nouns can also have fixed stress.
- Masculine polysyllabic stems ending in a consonant+⟨-a⟩. These nouns can also have fixed stress.
- Feminine monosyllabic stems ending in a consonant or a consonant +⟨-a⟩. These nouns can also have fixed stress.
- Feminine polysyllabic stems ending in a consonant. These nouns can also have fixed stress.
- Feminine polysyllabic stems ending in a consonant+⟨-a⟩. These nouns can also have fixed stress.
- Neuter monosyllabic stems ending in a consonant+⟨-ô⟩. These nouns can also have fixed stress.
- Feminine nouns with polysyllabic stems except compounds formed with ⟨-môc⟩ and ⟨vë-⟩.

Some shift it left in non-animate accusative singular and the nominative and accusative plural and dual.

- The stress shifts from the final stem syllable to the initial syllable of the noun.

- rôˈbôta ("work") > ˈrôbôtã (accusative singular)

Nouns with this type of shift include:

- Masculine polysyllabic stems ending in a consonant+⟨-a⟩ of which there is only one example.
- Feminine polysyllabic stems ending in a consonant+⟨-a⟩. These nouns can also have fixed stress.
- Feminine polysyllabic stems ending in a consonant+⟨-é⟩, of which there is one example.

All other nouns have fixed stress.

General rules:

- Feminine nouns with monosyllabic stems ending in a consonant usually have fixed stress, with the exception of 9 nouns.
- Masculine nouns ending in a consonant+⟨-a⟩ are always have fixed stress except those ending ⟨-ola⟩, which can be of either gender.
- Masculine nouns ending in a consonant+⟨-a⟩ and feminine nouns ending in a consonant+⟨y⟩ are considered nouns ending in a consonant.
- Nouns ending in a consonant+⟨-a⟩ never stress the last syllable of the word.
- Feminine nouns ending in a consonant always have stress on the first syllable, with two exceptions.
- Feminine nouns ending in a consonant+⟨-o⟩ always stress the last syllable, with a few exceptions.
- Neuter nouns ending in a consonant+⟨-ô⟩ never stress the last syllable, with one exception.
- Neuter nouns ending in a consonant+⟨-é⟩ always stress the penultimate syllable.
- Neuter nouns ending in a consonant+⟨-ã⟩ stress the initial syllable.

It is possible to predict the stress pattern of a noun if one knows:

1. If a noun has fixed or mobile stress
2. The number of syllables of the stem
3. The stressed syllable of the nominative singular
4. The gender
5. The type of declension

In Slovincian, prepositions can act as proclitics and take stress completely away from masculine and feminine nouns ending in a consonant or a consonant+⟨-a⟩ and from neuter nouns ending in a consonant+⟨-ô⟩ or in a consonant+⟨-ã⟩.

This happens to:

- All nouns with a non-syllabic or monosyllabic stem, fixed or stress that shifts right in the genitive, dative, instrumental, and locative plural have stress retracted when the initial syllable of the word is stress, except in the genitive plural ending in -∅.
- Nouns with mobile stress with polysyllabic stems retract the stress in words which are stressed on the initial syllable of the word.

No retraction occurs in:

- Nouns with polysyllabic stems with fixed stress.
- Polysyllabic prepositions and a few monosyllabic prepositions.
- Prepositional phrases where another word, such as a determiner or adjective, is between the preposition and the noun.

There is a strong tendency for words with stress on final or only syllable of the inflectional suffix when there is a preposition to retract to the initial syllable of the word.

Sometimes both the noun and the preposition are stressed.

== Adjectives ==
There are long, short, and possessive adjectives. Short adjectives are uncommon. Short adjectives are used predicatively. In addition to hard and soft declension, like Kashubian, Slovincian velar stems soften in the nominative but are hard in other cases.

Hard adjective declension
Case	Singular			Plural			Dual		
Case	Masculine	Feminine	Neuter	Masculine	Feminine	Neuter	Masculine	Feminine	Neuter
Nominative	nôˈwy	nôˈwo	nôˈwé	nôˈwy (virile), nôˈwé (non-virile)	nôˈwé	nôˈwé	nôˈwo	nôˈwé	nôˈwé
Genitive	nôˈwéwo, nôˈwo	nôˈwé	nôˈwéwo, nôˈwo	nôˈwëch	nôˈwëch	nôˈwëch	= pl	= pl	= pl
Dative	nôˈwémú	nôˈwy	nôˈwémú	nôˈwym	nôˈwym	nôˈwym	nôˈwëma	nôˈwëma	nôˈwëma
Accusative	Inanimate: nôˈwy Animate: nôˈwéwo, nôˈwo	nôˈwõ	nôˈwé	Inanimate: nôˈwy (virile), nôwė (non-virile); Animate: nôˈwëch	nôˈwé	nôˈwé	nôˈwo	nôˈwé	nôˈwé
Instrumental	nôˈwym	nôˈwõ	nôˈwym	nôˈwëmy	nôˈwëmy	nôˈwëmy	nôˈwëma	nôˈwëma	nôˈwëma
Locative	nôˈwym	nôˈwy	nôˈwym	nôˈwëch	nôˈwëch	nôˈwëch	= pl	= pl	= pl

Hard adjective declension
Case	Singular			Plural			Dual		
Case	Masculine	Feminine	Neuter	Masculine	Feminine	Neuter	Masculine	Feminine	Neuter
Nominative	ˈstory	ˈstoro	ˈstoré	ˈstorzy (virile), ˈstoré (non-virile)	ˈstoré	ˈstoré	ˈstoro	ˈstoré	ˈstoré
Genitive	ˈstoréwo, ˈstoro	ˈstoré	ˈstoréwo, ˈstoro	ˈstorëch	ˈstorëch	ˈstorëch	= pl	= pl	= pl
Dative	ˈstorémú	ˈstory	ˈstorémú	ˈstorym	ˈstorym	ˈstorym	ˈstorëma	ˈstorëma	ˈstorëma
Accusative	Inanimate: ˈstory Animate: ˈstoréwo, ˈstoro	ˈstorõ	ˈstoré	Inanimate: ˈstory (virile), ˈstoré (non-virile); Animate: ˈstorëch	ˈstoré	ˈstoré	ˈstoré	ˈstoré	ˈstoré
Instrumental	ˈstorym	ˈstorõ	ˈstorim	ˈstorëmy	ˈstorëmy	ˈstorëmy	ˈstorëma	ˈstorëma	ˈstorëma
Locative	ˈstorym	ˈstory	ˈstorym	ˈstorëch	ˈstorëch	ˈstorëch	= pl	= pl	= pl

Soft adjective declension
Case	Singular			Plural			Dual		
Case	Masculine	Feminine	Neuter	Masculine	Feminine	Neuter	Masculine	Feminine	Neuter
Nominative	wôwˈczy	wôwˈczo	wôwˈczé	wôwˈczy (virile), wôwˈczé (non-virile)	wôwˈczé	wôwˈczé	wôwˈczo	wôwˈczé	wôwˈczé
Genitive	wôwˈczéwo, wôwˈczo	wôwˈczé	wôwˈczéwo, wôwˈczo	wôwˈczich	wôwˈczich	wôwˈczich	= pl	= pl	= pl
Dative	wôwˈczémú	wôwˈczy	wôwˈczémú	wôwˈczym	wôwˈczym	wôwˈczym	wôwˈczima	wôwˈczima	wôwˈczima
Accusative	Inanimate: wôwˈczy Animate: wôwˈczéwo, wôwˈczo	wôwˈczõ	wôwˈczé	Inanimate: wôwˈczy (virile), wôwˈczé (non-virile); Animate: wôwˈczych	wôwˈczé	wôwˈczé	wôwˈczé	wôwˈczé	wôwˈczé
Instrumental	wôwˈczym	wôwˈczõ	wôwˈczym	wôwˈczimy	wôwˈczimy	wôwˈczimy	wôwˈczima	wôwˈczima	wôwˈczima
Locative	wôwˈczym	wôwˈczy	wôwˈczym	wôwˈczich	wôwˈczich	wôwˈczich	= pl	= pl	= pl

Soft adjective declension
Case	Singular			Plural			Dual		
Case	Masculine	Feminine	Neuter	Masculine	Feminine	Neuter	Masculine	Feminine	Neuter
Nominative	ˈtónjy	ˈtónjo	ˈtónjé	ˈtónjy (virile), ˈtónjé (non-virile)	ˈtónjé	ˈtónjé	ˈtónjo	ˈtónjé	ˈtónjé
Genitive	ˈtónjéwo, ˈtónjo	ˈtónjo	ˈtónjéwo, ˈtónjo	ˈtónjich	ˈtónjich	ˈtónjich	= pl	= pl	= pl
Dative	ˈtónjémú	ˈtónjy	ˈtónjémú	ˈtónjim	ˈtónjim	ˈtónjim	ˈtónjima	ˈtónjima	ˈtónjima
Accusative	Inanimate: ˈtónjy Animate: ˈtónjéwo, ˈtónjo	ˈtónjõ	ˈtónjé	Inanimate: ˈtónjy (virile), ˈtónjé (non-virile); Animate: ˈtónjich	ˈtónjé	ˈtónjé	ˈtónjé	ˈtónjé	ˈtónjé
Instrumental	ˈtónjim	ˈtónjõ	ˈtónjim	ˈtónjimy	ˈtónjimy	ˈtónjimy	ˈtónjima	ˈtónjima	ˈtónjima
Locative	ˈtónjim	ˈtónjy	ˈtónjim	ˈtónjich	ˈtónjich	ˈtónjich	= pl	= pl	= pl

Velar declension
Case	Singular			Plural			Dual		
Case	Masculine	Feminine	Neuter	Masculine	Feminine	Neuter	Masculine	Feminine	Neuter
Nominative	cëchjˈy	cëchˈo	cëchjˈé	cëchjˈy (virile), cëchjˈé (non-virile)	cëchjˈé	cëchjˈé	cëchˈo	cëchjˈé	cëchjˈé
Genitive	cëchjˈéwo, cëcho	cëchjˈé	cëchjˈéwo, cëchˈo	cëˈchjich	cëˈchjich	cëˈchjich	= pl	= pl	= pl
Dative	cëchjˈémú	cëchjˈy	cëchjˈémú	cëchjˈym	cëchjˈym	cëchjˈym	cëˈchjima	cëˈchjima	cëˈchjima
Accusative	Inanimate: cëchjˈy Animate: cëchjˈéwo, cëchˈo	cëchˈõ	cëchjˈé	Inanimate: cëchjˈy (virile), cëchjˈé (non-virile); Animate: cëchjˈych	cëchjˈé	cëchjˈé	cëchjˈé	cëchjˈé	cëchjˈé
Instrumental	cëchjˈym	cëchˈõ	cëchjˈym	cëˈchjimy	cëˈchjimy	cëˈchjimy	cëˈchjimy	cëˈchjimy	cëˈchjimy
Locative	cëchjˈym	cëchjˈy	cëchjˈym	cëˈchjich	cëˈchjich	cëˈchjich	= pl	= pl	= pl

Velar declension
Case	Singular			Plural			Dual		
Case	Masculine	Feminine	Neuter	Masculine	Feminine	Neuter	Masculine	Feminine	Neuter
Nominative	ˈwjelgjy	ˈwjelgo	ˈwjelgjé	ˈwjelzy (virile), ˈwjelgjé (non-virile)	ˈwjelgjé	ˈwjelgjé	ˈwjelgo	ˈwjelgjé	ˈwjelgjé
Genitive	ˈwjelgjéwo, ˈwjelgo	ˈwjelgjé	ˈwjelgjéwo, ˈwjelgo	ˈwjelgjich	ˈwjelgjich	ˈwjelgjich	= pl	= pl	= pl
Dative	ˈwjelgjémú	ˈwjelgjy	ˈwjelgjémú	ˈwjelgjim	ˈwjelgjim	ˈwjelgjim	ˈwjelgjima	ˈwjelgjima	ˈwjelgjima
Accusative	Inanimate: ˈwjelgjy Animate: ˈwjelgjéwo, ˈwjelgo	ˈwjelgõ	ˈwjelgjé	Inanimate: wjelzy (virile), ˈwjelgjé (non-virile); Animate: ˈwjelgjych	ˈwjelgjé	ˈwjelgjé	ˈwjelgjé	ˈwjelgjé	ˈwjelgjé
Instrumental	ˈwjelgjim	ˈwjelgõ	ˈwjelgjim	ˈwjelgjimy	ˈwjelgjimy	ˈwjelgjimy	ˈwjelgjima	ˈwjelgjima	ˈwjelgjima
Locative	ˈwjelgjim	ˈwjelgjy	ˈwjelgjim	ˈwjelgjich	ˈwjelgjich	ˈwjelgjich	= pl	= pl	= pl

The short masculine/neuter genitive form and ⟨-o⟩ is most often found with adjectives that do not have a stress on the final syllable, especially when they are used as nouns. It is rare in adjectives with word-final stress, and the most rare in velar stems, which, even when not stressed word-finally, prefer ⟨-éwo⟩. For ˈzly ("bad"), the genitive is always ˈzlévo.

⟨-ë⟩ is sometimes used instead of the phonetic ⟨-i⟩ in soft stems in the genitive-instrumental-locative plural and dative-instrumental dual, this almost never happens with velar stems.

=== Adjective comparative and superlative ===
Slovincian has ⟨-szy⟩ and ⟨-êszy⟩ as comparative suffixes. ⟨-szy⟩ is used in stems that end with a single consonant. Some stems ending in ⟨-k⟩ typically lose it, but the ⟨k⟩ is often restored analogously. If a stem ends in multiple consonants, ⟨-êszy⟩, which can can stress and stem alternations such as ⟨t, n, r⟩ ~ ⟨c, nj, rz⟩.

- ˈsaty > ˈsatszy
- ˈkrótkjy > ˈkrótszy
- gãsˈty > gãsˈcêszy
- ˈmôkry > môˈkrzêszy

Slovincian, like other Slavic languages also has suppletive comparatives.

- ˈdôbry > ˈlêpszy
- ˈzly > ˈgôrszy
- ˈwjelgy > wjitzy
- ˈmoly > ˈmjênszy

The superlative is formed from the comparative with the prefix ⟨no-⟩.

=== Adjective stress patterns ===
The accent of the long adjectives is fixed.

Possessive adjectives ending in ⟨-ó⟩ and ⟨-yn⟩ have a definite and indefinite form in the lemma form, and a definite form everywhere else. Possessive adjectives derived from monosyllabic stems emphasize the stem syllable. Polysyllabic stems emphasize the last stem syllable if the base word has a movable accent; however, if the base word has a fixed accent, the possessive adjective emphasizes the same syllable as the base word. Other possessive adjectives have a fixed accent.

Place names ending in ⟨-ôwô, -ënô⟩ are neuter possessive adjectives; those ending in ⟨-ôwô⟩ withdraw the accent as much as possible.

Ordinal numerals are long adjectives and as such emphasize the penultimate syllable.

== Adverbs ==
Adverbs can be formed from adjectives as well as prepositional phrases.

=== Adverb comparative and superlative ===
The comparative adverb is formed by adding the suffix ⟨-é⟩. Adverbs also have suppletive comparatives. The superlative is formed by putting the prefix ⟨no-⟩ in front of the comparative. ⟨-é⟩ causes consonant softening: ⟨p, b, w, m, t, d, st, zd, n, k, g, ch, r⟩ alternate with ⟨pj, bj, wj, mj, c, dz, szcz, żdż, nj, cz, ż, sz, rz⟩.

== Pronouns ==
Pronouns share the same cases, numbers, and genders with nouns, but the vocative is the same as the nominative, and is only used with second person pronouns, and only personal pronouns have the dual. The three genders are only distinct for the non-personal or third-person pronouns. Pronouns may be used as clitics, and may occur generally in stressed or unstressed positions. Some have short forms, used in unstressed positions.

Personal pronouns
Case	Singular				Plural				Dual			
Case	1st		2nd		1st		2nd		1st		2nd	
Case	stressed	unstressed	stressed	unstressed	stressed	unstressed	stressed	unstressed	stressed	unstressed	stressed	unstressed
Nominative	ˈjo	jo	ˈtë	të	ˈmë	më	ˈwë	wë	ˈma m, ˈmjê f	ma m, mjê (Note: pronounced mjë) f	ˈwa m, ˈwjê f	wa m, wjê (Note: pronounced vjë) f
Genitive	ˈmjê	mjê	ˈcêbjê	cê (Note: pronounced cë)	ˈnas	—	ˈwas	—	ˈnajú	—	ˈwajú	—
Dative	ˈmjê	mjê	ˈtôbjê	cê, tê (Note: pronounced cë, të)	ˈnóm	nóm	ˈwóm	wóm	ˈnama	—	ˈwama	—
Accusative	ˈmjê	mjê	ˈcêbjê	cê	ˈnas	nas	ˈwas	was	ˈnajú	—	ˈwajú	—
Instrumental	ˈmnõ	—	tôˈbõ	—	ˈnamy	—	ˈwamy	—	ˈnama	—	ˈwama	—
Locative	ˈmjˈê	mjê	ˈcêbjê	cê	ˈnas	—	ˈwas	—	ˈnajú	—	ˈwajú	—

Reflexive pronoun
Case
Case	stressed	unstressed
Nominative	—	
Genitive	ˈsêbjê	sê (Note: pronounced së)
Dative	ˈsôbjê	sê
Accusative	—	sã, sê
Instrumental	sôˈbõ	—
Locative	ˈsêbjê	sê

In addition to personal pronouns, Slovincian also has:

- Demonstratives: ˈtên, ˈta, ˈtô ("this"), ˈnên, ˈna, ˈnô ("this"), ˈwôn, ˈwôna, ˈwônô ("he", "she", "it"), (occurring only in the nominative forms); taˈkjy, taˈko, taˈkjé ("such", which inflects as a long adjective), ˈjên ("he");
- Interrogative pronouns: ˈchtô ("who"), ˈcô ("what") and their compounds: ˈnjicht ("nobody"), ˈnjic ("nothing"); chtôˈlê, côˈlê; chtôˈbõdz, côˈbõdz; chtôˈkôlwjek, côˈkôlwjek; chtôleˈbõdz, côleˈbõdz, chtôleˈkôlwjek, côleˈkôlwjek; bëleˈchtô, bëleˈcô; dzeˈcô; ˈnjêjëden ("some"); ˈchtôry ("which"), jaˈkjy ("what"), ˈkóżdy ("every"), ˈjyny ("other") and their combinations: ˈchtôryˈlê, ˈchtôryˈbõdz, ˈchtôryˈkôlwjek, ˈchtôryleˈbõdz, ˈchtôryleˈkôlwjek, bëleˈchtôry, njêˈchtôry, njeˈchtôry; jaˈkjylê, jakjyˈbõdz, jakjyˈkôlwjek, jakjyleˈbõdz, jakjyleˈkôlwjek, bëleˈjakjy, njiˈjakjy; ˈkóżdyˈkôlwjek, wszeˈlakjy, wszeleˈjakjy, wszelerˈjakny, wszelerˈjakny ("all sorts"); ˈwszëden ("all"); ˈczy, ˈczo, ˈczé ("whose") and its compounds czyˈlê, czyˈbõdz, czyˈkôlwjek, czyleˈbõdz, czyleˈkôlwjek, bëleˈczy;
- Relative pronouns: the indeclinable cô serves as a general relative particle, to which the forms of ˈjên can be added in the oblique cases; ˈchtôry, ˈchtôro, ˈchtôré ("which") and jaˈkjy, jaˈko, jaˈkjé ("such") (the last two inflect as a long adjective);
- Indefinite pronouns: ˈchtôsz, ˈchtesz ("who?"), ˈcesz ("what?"), ˈchtôrysz, ˈchttôrósz, ˈchttôresz ("which one?") and jaˈkjysz, jaˈkosz, jaˈkjéjsz ("of what kind?"), ˈczysz, ˈczosz, ˈczéjsz ("whose?") (the last three inflect as a long adjective);
- Quantitative pronouns: ˈjëden, ˈjëna, ˈjënô ("one"), ˈdwa, ˈdwjê ("two"), ˈwôba, ˈwôbjë, ("both"), ˈżõden, ˈżóno, ˈżóné ("none");
- Possessive pronouns: ˈmój ("my"), ˈtwój ("your"), ˈswój (reflexive possessive pronoun "one's"), ˈnasz ("our"), ˈwasz ("you all's");

Declension of tên
Case	Singular			Plural			Dual		
Case	Masculine	Feminine	Neuter	Masculine	Feminine	Neuter	Masculine	Feminine	Neuter
Nominative	ˈtên	ˈta	ˈtô	ˈty (virile) tˈë (non-virile)	ˈty, tˈë	ˈtë	ˈta	ˈtë	ˈtë
Genitive	ˈtêwo, to (unstressed)	ˈté	ˈtêwo, to (unstressed)	ˈtëch (pronounced tech when unstressed)	ˈtëch (pronounced tech when unstressed)	ˈtëch (pronounced tech when unstressed)	= pl	= pl	= pl
Dative	ˈtêmú	ˈty	ˈtêmú	ˈtym	ˈtym	ˈtym	ˈtëma	ˈtëma	ˈtëma
Accusative	Inanimate: ˈtên Animate: ˈtêwo, ˈto (unstressed)	ˈtã	ˈtô	ˈty, ˈtë (inanimate) ˈtëch (inanimate; pronounced tech when unstressed)	ˈtë	ˈtë	ˈta	ˈtë	ˈtë
Instrumental	ˈtym	ˈtõ	ˈtym	ˈtëmy	ˈtëmy	ˈtëmy	ˈtëma	ˈtëma	ˈtëma
Locative	ˈtym	ˈty	ˈtym	ˈtëch (pronounced tech when unstressed)	ˈtëch (pronounced tech when unstressed)	ˈtëch (pronounced tech when unstressed)	= pl	= pl	= pl

Declension of chtô, chteż "who"
Case
Nominative	ˈchtô, ˈchteż
Genitive	ˈkôwo, ˈko, ˈkjêwo
Dative	ˈkômú, ˈkjêmú
Accusative	ˈkôwo, ˈko, ˈkjêwo
Instrumental	ˈczym
Locative	ˈczym

Declension of cô, ceż "what"
Case
Nominative	ˈcô, ˈceż
Genitive	ˈczêwo, ˈczo
Dative	ˈczêmú
Accusative	ˈcô, ˈcesz
Instrumental	ˈczym
Locative	ˈczym

Declension of jên
Case	Singular			Plural			Dual		
Case	Masculine	Feminine	Neuter	Masculine	Feminine	Neuter	Masculine	Feminine	Neuter
Nominative	ˈjên			—	—	—	—	—	—
Genitive	ˈjêwo (stressed) jêwo, jo, njewo, njo (unstressed)	ˈjé	ˈjêwo (stressed) jêwo, jo, njewo, njo (unstressed)	ˈjich, ˈnjich	ˈjich, ˈnjich	ˈjich, ˈnjich	ˈjú, ˈnjú	ˈjú, ˈnjú	ˈjú, ˈnjú
Dative	ˈjêmú (stressed) jêmú, mú (unstressed)	ˈjy	ˈjêmú (stressed) jêmú, mú (unstressed)	ˈjym	ˈjym	ˈjym	ˈjima, njima (stressed)	ˈnjima (stressed)	ˈnjima (stressed)
Accusative	Inanimate: ˈjên (stressed); jên, njên (unstressed); Animate: ˈjêwo, jo (stressed) jêwo, jo, njêwo, njo (unstressed)	ˈjã, njã	jë (unstressed)	ˈjich, ˈnjich (stressed) jich, jë, një (unstressed)	jë, një (unstressed)	jë, një (unstressed)	ˈjich, ˈnjich (stressed)	jë, një (unstressed)	jë, një (unstressed)
Instrumental	ˈnjym	ˈjõ	ˈnjym	ˈnjimy (stressed)	ˈnjimy (stressed)	ˈnjimy (stressed)	ˈjima, njima	ˈnjima (stressed)	ˈnjima (stressed)
Locative	ˈnjym	ˈnjy	ˈnjym	ˈjich, ˈnjich (stressed)	ˈjich, ˈnjich (stressed)	ˈjich, ˈnjich (stressed)	= pl	= pl	= pl

Alternative forms starting with ⟨nj-⟩ are used after prepositions.

Declension of possessive pronouns
Case	Singular			Plural			Dual		
Case	Masculine	Feminine	Neuter	Masculine	Feminine	Neuter	Masculine	Feminine	Neuter
Nominative	ˈmój	ˈmo	ˈmé	ˈmy, ˈmé	ˈmé	ˈmé	ˈmo	ˈmé	ˈmé
Genitive	ˈméwo, ˈmo	ˈmé	ˈméwo, ˈmo	ˈmëch	ˈmëch	ˈmëch	= pl	= pl	= pl
Dative	ˈmémú	ˈmy	ˈmémú	ˈmym	ˈmym	ˈmym	ˈmëma	ˈmëma	ˈmëma
Accusative	Inanimate: ˈmój Animate: ˈméwo, ˈmo	ˈmõ	ˈmé	Inanimate: ˈmy, ˈmé Animate: ˈmëch	ˈmé	ˈmé	ˈmé	ˈmé	ˈmé
Instrumental	ˈmym	ˈmõ	ˈmym	ˈmëmy	ˈmëmy	ˈmëmy	ˈmëma	ˈmëma	ˈmëma
Locative	ˈmym	ˈmy	ˈmym	ˈmëch	ˈmëch	ˈmëch	= pl	= pl	= pl

ˈtwój and ˈswój decline similarly, as well as ˈnasz and ˈwasz, but the latter only differ in the nominative and accusative. Many of these forms are the result of vowel contractions; uncontracted forms died out; but the nominative ˈmôja, ˈtwôja, ˈtwôje still occurred in folk songs and in the Lord's Prayer. ˈczy inflects like ˈmój, only in the plural and dual, it has ⟨i⟩ instead of ⟨ë⟩: ˈczimy, ˈczima.

Declension of wszëden
Case	Singular			Plural			Dual		
Case	Masculine	Feminine	Neuter	Masculine	Feminine	Neuter	Masculine	Feminine	Neuter
Nominative	ˈwszëden	ˈwszëtka	ˈwszëtkô	ˈwszëtcë (virile), ˈwszëtkji (non-virile)	ˈwszëtkji	ˈwszëtkji	= pl	= pl	= pl
Genitive	ˈwszêwo	ˈwszé	ˈwszêwo	ˈwszêch	ˈwszêch	ˈwszêch	= pl	= pl	= pl
Dative	ˈwszêmú	ˈwszy	ˈwszêmú	ˈwszym	ˈwszym	ˈwszym	= pl	= pl	= pl
Accusative	Inanimate: ˈwszëden Animate: ˈwszêwo	ˈwszëtką	ˈwszëtkô	Inanimate: ˈwszëtkji Animate: ˈwszêch	ˈwszëtkã	ˈwszëtkô	= pl	= pl	= pl
Instrumental	ˈwszym	ˈwszõ	ˈwszym	ˈwszëmy	ˈwszëmy	ˈwszëmy	= pl	= pl	= pl
Locative	ˈwszym	ˈwszy	ˈwszym	ˈwszêch	ˈwszêch	ˈwszêch	= pl	= pl	= pl

== Numerals ==
Slovincian has ordinal, cardinal, and collective numerals.

The cardinal numbers 1-20, words for tens (30, 40, etc.), hundreds, and thousands in Slovincian have a single word, all others are made through combining other cardinal numbers. There are no ordinals of numbers over 30 in Slovenian.

The numerals jˈëden, dwˈa, trzˈë, sztˈérzë ("one, two, three, four") and are declinable. Numbers from five (pjˈync) to twenty (dwadzˈêsca) except word for "teens" ending in ⟨-e⟩ are declinable. Teens are usually indeclinable, but sometimes decline like adjectives. They are sometimes reduced to ⟨-no⟩. tˈësinc ("thousand") behaves grammatically like a noun and declines as one.

Ordinal numerals are long adjectives and are inflected as such. There are no ordinal numerals above 30. Collective numerals are only used in the nominative and accusative.

Multiplicative numerals are long adjectives; numerals ending in ⟨-jak⟩ are adverbs.

The fractional number words formed with ⟨pôù-⟩ are usually declinable.

=== Numeral stress patterns ===
Di- and multi-syllable cardinal numerals are emphasized on the last syllable. In inflectable numerals the accent is fixed.

Numerals for tens from 30 to 90 and for thousands have the main stress on the stem (the root for hundred, thousand). Words for the thousands often have a primary stress on both elements. This is always the case for those exceeding 10,000. Conversely, the hundreds emphasize the number word; if this is polysyllabic, the following noun has a secondary accent.

- dwadzˈêscë ("twenty"), where ⟨dzêsc-⟩ is the stem for "ten"
- ˈtrzësta or ˈtrzëˌsta ("three hundred")

Words for numerals between the tens (21, 34, etc.) are composed of the ones digit numeral, a connecting a ("and"), and the tens numeral. In the expressions for 21 to 29, the primary stress is on the connecting a and the number words themselves usually both have a secondary stress, or both number words are fully stressed and the a follows the decade number word proclitic. For non-tens numerals higher than 30, the latter is always the case.

- dwa‿ˈa‿dwadzêscë
- trzë‿a‿dvadzˈêscë

Collective numerals are emphasized on the same syllable as the cardinal numeral counterparts.

The distributive numerals formed with ⟨po-, pô-⟩ place the accent on the prefix up to 40.

Fractional numerals formed with ⟨pôù-⟩ emphasize either the prefix or the penultimate syllable. ⟨pôù-⟩ has a secondary accent if the word contains more than three syllables. In the inflected forms there is only penultimate stress.

== Verbs ==
Like Polish and Kashubian, Slovincian has lost the Proto-Slavic imperfect and the aorist forms. The l-participle has taken its place as the past tense form. The other differences in tense are either expressed through paraphrases or remain formally unmarked. The supine has also disappeared. Most participles have been lost. The Slovincian future tense, perfect, pluperfect, conditional and passive form have periphrastic formations.

The lemma forms of verbs is the infinitive, ending in ⟨-c⟩. Verbs can be divided into five main classes, each with several subclasses.

Slovincian has perfective and imperfective aspects verbs much like Kashubian or Polish.

=== Conjugation ===
Present tense personal endings
	infinitive (wiezc)		
	Singular	Plural	Dual
1st	-ã, -m	-më	-ma, -më
2nd	-sz	-ce	-ta, -te
3rd	-∅	-ó	-ta, -te

Dual forms for neuter subjects are not used.

The imperative is formed in two ways, depending on whether the stem ends in a consonant or a vowel. Stems ending in a consonant form the imperative by adding ⟨-i⟩ (⟨-ë⟩ after hard consonants.) Stems ending in a vowel add the ending ⟨-j⟩, which can sometimes disappear. The third person singular imperative is the same as the second person imperative, and the third person plural and dual imperative is formed with ⟨nô⟩ and the third person plural/dual present form

The active present participle has the ending ⟨-õcy⟩ for all verbs and is inflected as a long adjective. The present adverbial participle is formed ⟨-õcë⟩, forms without ⟨-ë⟩ do not occur, and is indeclinable.

The past tense is formed using the old l-participle and declines for gender and number:

- Masculine singular: ⟨-l⟩
- Feminine singular: ⟨-la⟩
- Neuter singular: ⟨-lô⟩
- Virile plural: ⟨-ly⟩
- Non-virile: ⟨-le⟩

The masculine singular ending ⟨-l⟩ disappears if a verb has an consonantal stem (classes IA, IIA., IIB and sometimes III1A and V).

- pjêc ("to bake") (stem pjêk-) > pjêk ("masculine singular past")

The feminine singular and masculine dual contract in classes IB, IC, III1B—E, III2, IVB, IVC. and some of classes III1A and V.

- *bьrala > ˈbrala > ˈbra
- *xъtěla > cela > ca

In classes IIG and with some classes of III1A, in the feminine singular and masculine dual, the ⟨-l-⟩ disappears and contraction occurs; in the masculine singular, to ⟨-ón-⟩ and in other forms the ⟨-l-⟩ combines with the nasal vowel;

- *tisnąlъ > ˈcësnón
- *tisnąla > cësˈnã (pronounced cesˈnã)
- *tisnąlo > ˈcësnanô

The past participle is formed with ⟨-ly, -ty, -ny, -jôny⟩ and inflected as a long adjective. These participles have completely collapsed in stress. Regardless of the suffix with which it is formed, it has an active or passive meaning depending on the verbal term. ⟨-ly⟩ is common in classes IA, IIA, IIB, and often in classes III2A, III2B, IVB, as well as some verbs of class V. ⟨-ty⟩ is used in class III1A. ⟨-ny⟩ is with classes IB, IC, III1B, III1C, III1D, III2C, III2D, IVC, and subclasses of III1A. and III2A. and some classes III2A, III2B, IVB, as well as some classes of V and IIC. ⟨-jôny⟩ is only found in the verbs of class IVA.

A verbal noun, which is a declinable neuter noun, can be formed from every verb with the suffixes ⟨-cé, -njé, and -ênjé⟩. ⟨-cé⟩ is common wherever the past participle is formed by ⟨-ty⟩ (class III1A), except for some verbs ending with ⟨r⟩, which form the verbal noun from the present stem. ⟨-njé⟩ is used in classes IB, IC, III1B—E, III2, IVB, IVC, and some verbs of the classes III1A, V, IA, IIC, and III1A2a. ⟨-ênjé⟩ is used in class IVA.

The present tense of the perfective verb is usually used as the future tense, e.g. B. jo‿ˈpôjadã ("I will go (by vehicle)") next to jo‿ˈjadã "I am going (by vehicle)". An imperfective future is formed with the bõdã+ the l-participle, e.g. B. jo‿tô‿ˈbõdã ˈczynjél ("I will be doing that"), but this construction is rare. Sometimes the perfective future is the same as the imperfective present: jo‿ˈrzúcã ("I will throw/I am throwing) from the infinitives rzëcac (impferfective) and rzëcëc (pronounced rzëcec; perfective).

A perfect tense and the pluperfect tense can be formed through paraphrasis, bëc l-participle/mjêc + l-participle or a past passive participle. If bëc is used, the participle agrees in gender and number. If mjêc is used, the participle will either be in the neuter singular, or, much more regularly in gender and number.

The conditional is formed by combining an l-participle with the particle bä, which has a shortened form b.

The passive voice can be formed using bëc + a passive participle or by using sã, however the active is usually preferred.

==== Class I ====
⟨-t, -d, -s, -z, -k, -g, -r⟩ stems belong to class IA.

Class IA
Infinitive
ˈplêsc "to plait"
Present tense	Singular	Plural	Dual
1st	ˈplôtã	ˈplêcemë	ˈplêcema, ˈplêcemë
2nd	ˈplêcesz	ˈplêcece	ˈplêceta, ˈplêcete
3rd	ˈplêce	ˈplôtõ	ˈplêcete, ˈplêcete
Imperative	Singular	Plural	Dual
1st	—	plêˈcëmë	plêˈcëma
2nd	ˈplêcë	plêˈcëce	plêˈcëta, plêˈcëte
3rd	ˈplêcë	ˈplôtõ	—
active present participle	plêˈcõcy		
present adverbial participle	plôˈtõcë		
past participle	ˈplôtly		
Verbal noun	plêˈcênjé		
Past forms	Singular	Plural	Dual
Past forms	Masculine: ˈplót, plôt Feminine: ˈplôtla Neuter: ˈplôtlô	Virile: ˈplêtly Non-virile: ˈplôtle	Virile: ˈplôtla Non-virile: ˈplôtle

Class IA
Infinitive
ˈrzêc "to speak"
Present tense	Singular	Plural	Dual
1st	ˈrzêkã	ˈrzêczemë	ˈrzêczema, ˈrzêczemë
2nd	ˈrzêczesz	ˈrzêczece	ˈrzêczeta, ˈrzczete
3rd	ˈrzêczë	ˈrzêkõ	—
Imperative	Singular	Plural	Dual
1st	—	ˈrzêczimë	ˈrzêczima, ˈrzêczimë
2nd	ˈrzêczi	ˈrzêczice	ˈrzêczita, ˈrzêczice
3rd	ˈrzêczi	ˈrzêczita	—
active present participle	ˈrzêkõcy		
present adverbial participle	ˈrzêkõcë		
past participle	ˈrzêkly		
Verbal noun	rzêčˈênjé		
Past forms	Singular	Plural	Dual
Past forms	Masculine: ˈrzêk Feminine: ˈrzêkla Neuter: ˈrzêklô	Virile: ˈrzêkly Non-virile: ˈrzêkle	Virile: ˈrzêkla Non-virile: ˈrzêkle

Class IB
Infinitive
ˈpjoc "to sing"
Present tense	Singular	Plural	Dual
1st	ˈpôjã	ˈpôjemë	ˈpôjema, ˈpôjemë
2nd	ˈpôjesz	ˈpôjece	ˈpôjeta, ˈpôjete
3rd	ˈpôje	ˈpôjõ	—
Imperative	Singular	Plural	Dual
1st	—	ˈpójmë, ˈpôjmë	ˈpójma, ˈpójmë, pôˈjima, pôˈjimë
2nd	ˈpój, ˈpôji	ˈpójce, pôˈjice	ˈpójta, ˈpójte, pôˈjita, pôˈjite
3rd	ˈpój, ˈpôjy	ˈpójce, pôˈjyce	—
active present participle	pôˈjõcy		
present adverbial participle	pôˈjõce		
past participle	ˈpjóny		
Verbal noun	ˈpjênjé		
Past forms	Singular	Plural	Dual
Past forms	Masculine: ˈpjôùl Feminine: ˈpja Neuter: ˈpjalô	Virile: ˈpjêly Non-virile: ˈpjale	Virile: ˈpja Non-virile: ˈpjale

Class IC
Infinitive
ˈlgac "to (tell a) lie"
Present tense	Singular	Plural	Dual
1st	ˈlgã	ˈlżêmë	ˈlżêma, ˈlżêmë
2nd	ˈlżêsz	ˈlżêce	ˈlżêta, ˈlżête
3rd	ˈlżê	ˈlgõ	—
Imperative	Singular	Plural	Dual
1st	—	ˈlżëmë	ˈlżëma, ˈlżëmë
2nd	ˈlżë	ˈlżëce	ˈlżëta, ˈlżëte
3rd	ˈlżë	ˈlżëta, ˈlżëte	—
active present participle	ˈlgõcy		
present adverbial participle	ˈlgõcë		
past participle	ˈlgóny		
Verbal noun	ˈlganjé		
Past forms	Singular	Plural	Dual
Past forms	Masculine: ˈlgôùl Feminine: ˈlga Neuter: ˈlgalô	Virile: ˈlgêly Non-virile: ˈlgale	Virile: ˈlga Non-virile: ˈlgale

Class IC
Infinitive
ˈdôżdac "to wait"
Present tense	Singular	Plural	Dual
1st	ˈdôżdã	ˈdôżdżemë	ˈdôżdżema, ˈdôżdżemë
2nd	ˈdôżdżesz	ˈdôżdżece	ˈdôżdżeta, ˈdôżdżete
3rd	ˈdôżdże	ˈdôżdõ	—
Imperative	Singular	Plural	Dual
1st	—	ˈdôżdżimë	ˈdôżdżima, ˈdôżdżimë
2nd	ˈdôżdżi	ˈdôżdżice	ˈdôżdżita, ˈdôżdżite
3rd	ˈdôżdżi	ˈdôżdżita, ˈdôżdżite	—
active present participle	dôˈżdõcy		
present adverbial participle	dôˈżdõcë		
past participle	dôˈżdóny		
Verbal noun	dôˈżdanjé		
Past forms	Singular	Plural	Dual
Past forms	Masculine: ˈdôżdôùl Feminine: dôżdżˈa Neuter: ˈdôżdalô	Virile: ˈdôżdêly Non-virile: ˈdôżdale	Virile: dôˈżda Non-virile: ˈdôżdale

==== Class II ====
Class II
Infinitive
ˈkrasc "to steal"
Present tense	Singular	Plural	Dual
1st	ˈkradnjã	ˈkradnjemë	ˈkradnjema, ˈkradnjemë
2nd	ˈkradnjesz	ˈkradnjece	ˈkradnjeta, ˈkradnjete
3rd	ˈkradnje	ˈkradnjõ	—
Imperative	Singular	Plural	Dual
1st	—	kradˈnjimä	kradˈnjima, kradˈnjimä
2nd	ˈkradnji	kradˈnjice	kradˈnjita, kradˈnjite
3rd	ˈkradnji	ˈkradnjõ	—
active present participle	kradˈnjõcy		
present adverbial participle	kradˈnjõcë		
past participle	ˈkradly		
Verbal noun	kradˈnjênjé		
Past forms	Singular	Plural	Dual
Past forms	Masculine: ˈkrod Feminine: ˈkradla Neuter: ˈkradlô	Virile: ˈkradly Non-virile: ˈkradle	Virile: ˈkradla Non-virile: ˈkradle

Class II
Infinitive
ˈcygnõc "to pull"
Present tense	Singular	Plural	Dual
1st	ˈcygnjã	ˈcygnjemë	ˈcygnjema, ˈcygnjemë
2nd	ˈcygnjesz	ˈcygnjece	ˈcygnjeta, ˈcygnjete
3rd	ˈcygnje	ˈcygnjõ	—
Imperative	Singular	Plural	Dual
1st	—	cëgˈnjimë	cëgˈnjima, cëgˈnjimë
2nd	ˈcëgnji	cëgˈnjice	cëgˈnjita, cãgˈnjite
3rd	ˈcëgnji	cëgˈnjice	—
active present participle	cygˈnjõcy		
present adverbial participle	cygˈnõcë		
past participle	cygˈnjôny		
Verbal noun	cygˈnjênjé		
Past forms	Singular	Plural	Dual
Past forms	Masculine: ˈcygnón Feminine: ˈcygnã Neuter: ˈcygnanô	Virile: ˈcygnany Non-virile: ˈcygnane	Virile: ˈcygnã Non-virile: ˈcygnane

==== Class III ====
Class III1A comprises verbs with stem-final ⟨i, ë, ú, ô, a, n, m, r, rz⟩.

- III1A1a: stem vowel is ⟨y⟩ from Proto-Slavic *i

- ˈbjic > ˈbjijã

- III1A1b: stem vowel is ⟨ë⟩ from Proto-Slavic *i, *y

- ˈszëc > ˈszëjã

- III1A1c: stem vowel is ⟨ú⟩ from Proto-Slavic *u

- ˈczúc > ˈczújã

- III1A1d: stem vowel is ⟨ë⟩ from Proto-Slavic *u

- ˈklëc > ˈklëjã

- III1A1e: stem vowel is ⟨ë⟩ from Proto-Slavic *ô

- ˈklôc > ˈklôjã

- III1A1f: stem vowel is ⟨a⟩ from Proto-Slavic *ô

- ˈklôc > ˈklôjã

- III1A2a: stem consonant is ⟨n, m⟩

- ˈcyc > ˈtnã

- III1A2b: stem consonant is ⟨r, rz⟩ with no vowel

- drżéc > drzą

- III1A2c: stem consonant is ⟨r, rz⟩ with a vowel

- ˈpôrc > ˈpôrzã

Class III1A1b
Infinitive
ˈszëc "to sew"
Present tense	Singular	Plural	Dual
1st	ˈszëjã	ˈszëjemë	ˈszëjema, ˈszëjemë
2nd	ˈszëjesz	ˈszëjece	ˈszëjeta, ˈszëjete
3rd	ˈszëje	ˈszëjõ	—
Imperative	Singular	Plural	Dual
1st	—	ˈszymë	ˈszyma, ˈszymë
2nd	ˈszy	ˈszyca	ˈszita, ˈszitë
3rd	ˈszy	—	—
active present participle	szëˈjõcy		
present adverbial participle	szëˈjõcë		
past participle	ˈszëty		
Verbal noun	ˈszëcé		
Past forms	Singular	Plural	Dual
Past forms	Masculine: ˈszél Feminine: ˈszëla Neuter: ˈszëlô	Virile: ˈszëli Non-virile: ˈszële	Virile: ˈszëla Non-virile: ˈszële

Class III1A2a
Infinitive
'trzéc "to grate, to shred"
Present tense	Singular	Plural	Dual
1st	ˈtrzã	ˈtrzêmë	ˈtrzêma, ˈtrzêmë
2nd	ˈtrzêsz	ˈtrzêce	ˈtrzêta, ˈtrzête
3rd	ˈtrzê	ˈtrzõ	—
Imperative	Singular	Plural	Dual
1st	—	ˈtrzëmë	ˈtrzëma, ˈtrzëmë
2nd	ˈtrzë	ˈtrzëce	ˈtrzëta, ˈtrzëte
3rd	ˈtrzë	—	—
active present participle	ˈtrzõcy		
present adverbial participle	ˈtrzõce		
past participle	ˈcarty		
Verbal noun	ˈtrzênjé		
Past forms	Singular	Plural	Dual
Past forms	Masculine: ˈcar Feminine: ˈcarla Neuter: ˈcarlô	Virile: ˈcêrli Non-virile: ˈcarle	Virile: ˈcarla Non-virile: ˈcarle

Class III1A2b
Infinitive
ˈcic "to cut"
Present tense	Singular	Plural	Dual
1st	tnjã	ˈtnjêmë	ˈtnjêma, ˈtnjêmë
2nd	ˈtnjêsz	ˈtnjêce	ˈtnjêta, ˈtnjête
3rd	ˈtnjê	ˈtnjõ	—
Imperative	Singular	Plural	Dual
1st	—	ˈtnjimë	ˈtnjima, ˈtnjimë
2nd	ˈtnji	ˈtnjice	ˈtnjita, ˈtnjite
3rd	ˈtnjy	—	—
active present participle	ˈtnjõcy		
present adverbial participle	ˈtnjõcë		
past participle	ˈcãty		
Verbal noun	ˈcacé		
Past forms	Singular	Plural	Dual
Past forms	Masculine: ˈcón Feminine: ˈcã Neuter: ˈcanô	Virile: ˈcany Non-virile: ˈcane	Virile: ˈcã Non-virile: ˈcane

Class III1A2c
Infinitive
ˈpôrc "to separate"
Present tense	Singular	Plural	Dual
1st	ˈpôrzã	ˈpôrzemë	ˈpôrzema, ˈpôrzemë
2nd	ˈpôrzesz	ˈpôrzece	ˈpôrzeta, ˈpôrzete
3rd	ˈpôrze	ˈpôrzõ	—
Imperative	Singular	Plural	Dual
1st	—	pôˈrzëmë	pôˈrzëma, pôˈrzëmë
2nd	ˈpôrzë	pôˈrzëce	pôˈrzëta, pôˈrzëte
3rd	ˈpôrzë	—	—
active present participle	pôˈrzõcy		
present adverbial participle	pôˈrzõcë		
past participle	ˈpôrty		
Verbal noun	ˈpôrcé		
Past forms	Singular	Plural	Dual
Past forms	Masculine: ˈpór Feminine: ˈpôrla Neuter: ˈpôrlô	Virile: ˈpôrly Non-virile: ˈpôrlw	Virile: ˈpôrla Non-virile: ˈpôrlëw

Class III1B comprises verbs whose past stems and the infinitive stems are the same as the verbal stem, augmented by the suffix -a-.

Class III1B
Infinitive
ˈsoc "to sow"
Present tense	Singular	Plural	Dual
1st	ˈsêjã	ˈsêjemë	ˈsêjema, ˈsêjemë
2nd	ˈsêje̯sz	ˈsêjece	ˈsêjeta, ˈsêjete
3rd	ˈsêje	ˈsêjõ	—
Imperative	Singular	Plural	Dual
1st	—	ˈsémë	ˈséma, ˈsémë
2nd	ˈsé	ˈséce	ˈséta, ˈséte
3rd	ˈsé	—	—
active present participle	sêˈjõcy		
present adverbial participle	sêˈjõcë		
past participle	ˈsóny		
Verbal noun	ˈsênjé		
Past forms	Singular	Plural	Dual
Past forms	Masculine: ˈsôùl Feminine: ˈsa Neuter: ˈsalô	Virile: ˈsêly Non-virile: ˈsale	Virile: ˈsa Non-virile: ˈsale

Class III1Ca comprises verbs whose past and infinitive stems are the same as the verbal stem, augmented by the suffix -a- and have e-present tenses and III1Cb has je-present tenses. Class III1D comprises verbs whose past and infinitive stems are the same as the verbal stem, augmented by the suffix -ja-.

- Class III1Ca: ˈbrac > ˈbjêrzã
- Class III1Cb: ˈdrapac > ˈdrapjã

Class III1Cb
Infinitive
ˈklêpac "to knock, to rap"
Present tense	Singular	Plural	Dual
1st	ˈklêpjã	ˈklêpjemë	ˈklêpjema, ˈklêpjemë
2nd	ˈklêpjesz	ˈklêpjece	ˈklêpjeta, ˈklêpjete
3rd	ˈklêpje	ˈklêpjõ	—
Imperative	Singular	Plural	Dual
1st	—	klêˈpjimë	klêˈpjima, klêˈpjimë
2nd	ˈklêpji	klêˈpjice	klêˈpjita, klêˈpjite
3rd	ˈklêpji	—	—
active present participle	klêˈpjõcy		
present adverbial participle	ˈklêpjõcë		
past participle	klêˈpóny		
Verbal noun	klêˈpanjé		
Past forms	Singular	Plural	Dual
Past forms	Masculine: ˈklêpôùl Feminine: kleˈpa Neuter: ˈklêpalô	Virile: ˈklêpaly Non-virile: ˈklêpale	Virile: ˈklêpa Non-virile: ˈklêpale

Class III1E comprises verbs whose past and infinitive stems are the same as the verbal stem, augmented by the suffix -ě-.

Class III1E
Infinitive
ˈcêc "to want"
Present tense	Singular	Plural	Dual
1st	cã	ˈcêmë	ˈcêma, ˈcêmë
2nd	ˈcêsz	ˈcêce	ˈcêta, ˈcête
3rd	ˈcê	ˈcõ	—
Imperative	Singular	Plural	Dual
1st	—	—	—
2nd	—	—	—
3rd	—	—	—
active present participle	ˈcõcy		
present adverbial participle	ˈcõcë		
past participle	—		
Verbal noun	ˈcênjé		
Past forms	Singular	Plural	Dual
Past forms	Masculine: ˈcôl Feminine: ˈca Neuter: ˈcalô	Virile: ˈcêly Non-virile: ˈcale	Virile: ˈca Non-virile: ˈcale

Class III2Aa comprises verb stems that start with a except for some primary verbs denominative and deverbative verbs. Class III2Ab comprises verb stems that with ě, only denominatives.

- Class III2Aa: ˈkaszlac > ˈkaszlã
- Class III2Ab: ˈstarzec > ˈstarzejã

Class III2Aa
Infinitive
ˈtrzëmac "to hold"
Present tense	Singular	Plural	Dual
1st	ˈtrzymã	ˈtrzymomë	ˈtrzymoma, ˈtrzymomë
2nd	ˈtrzymósz	ˈtrzymoce	ˈtrzymota, ˈtrzymote
3rd	ˈtrzimo	ˈtrzymõ	—
Imperative	Singular	Plural	Dual
1st	—	trzëˈmôùmë	trzëˈmôùma, trzëˈmôùmë
2nd	trzëˈmôù	trzëˈmôùce	trzëˈmôùta, trzëˈmôùte
3rd	trzëˈmô	—	—
active present participle	trzëmajˈõcy		
present adverbial participle	trzëmaˈjõcë		
past participle	trziˈmôny		
Verbal noun	trziˈmanjé		
Past forms	Singular	Plural	Dual
Past forms	Masculine: ˈtrzimôùl Feminine: trziˈma Neuter: ˈtrzimalô	Virile: ˈtrzimaly Non-virile: ˈtrzmale	Virile: trziˈma Non-virile: ˈtrzmale

Class III2Aa
Infinitive
ˈgrac "to play"
Present tense	Singular	Plural	Dual
1st	grã	ˈgromë	ˈgroma, ˈgromë
2nd	ˈgrosz	ˈgroce	ˈgrota, ˈgrote
3rd	ˈgro	ˈgrõ	—
Imperative	Singular	Plural	Dual
1st	—	ˈgrôùmë	ˈgrôùma, ˈgrôùmë
2nd	ˈgrôù	ˈgrôùcë	ˈgrôùta, ˈgrôùtë
3rd	ˈgrôù	—	—
active present participle	graˈjõcy, ˈgrõcy		
present adverbial participle	graˈjõcë, ˈgrõcë		
past participle	ˈgróny		
Verbal noun	ˈgranjé		
Past forms	Singular	Plural	Dual
Past forms	Masculine: ˈgrôùl Feminine: ˈgra Neuter: ˈgralô	Virile: ˈgraly Non-virile: ˈgrale	Virile: ˈgra Non-virile: ˈgrale

Class III2Ab
Infinitive
ˈstarzec "to age"
Present tense	Singular	Plural	Dual
1st	ˈstarzejã	staˈrzêjemë	staˈrzêjema, staˈrzêjemë
2nd	staˈrzêjesz	staˈrzêjece	staˈrzêjeta, staˈrzêjete
3rd	staˈrzêjë	staˈrzêjõ	—
Imperative	Singular	Plural	Dual
1st	—	staˈrzémë	staˈrzéma, staˈrzémë
2nd	ˈstarzé	staˈrzéce	staˈrzéta, staˈrzéte
3rd	ˈstarzé	—	—
active present participle	starzeˈjõcy		
present adverbial participle	starzeˈjõcë		
past participle	staˈrzaly		
Verbal noun	staˈrzenjé		
Past forms	Singular	Plural	Dual
Past forms	Masculine: ˈstarzôùl Feminine: ˈstarza Neuter: ˈstarzalô	Virile: ˈstarzely Non-virile: ˈstarzale	Virile: ˈstarza Non-virile: ˈstarzale

Class III2C comprises verb past and infinitive stems are the same as the verbal stem, augmented by the suffix -a-, and includes verbs whose inflection starts with -u-. Class III2D past and infinitive stems are the same as the verbal stem, augmented by the suffix -ja- and whose inflection starts with -a-. III2Ca and III2Da comprise denominative verbs and III2Cb and III2Db are iteratives of a-verbs. In III2C the imperative and active present participle suppleted by those of class III2D. This inflection only exists in the Kluki and Wierzchocino-Siecie dialects. For Class III2D present tense and present adverbial participle are not present and are replaced by those of Class III2C.

Class III2Ca
Infinitive
daˈrôwac "to gift"
Present tense	Singular	Plural	Dual
1st	ˈdarújã	daˈrújemë	daˈrújema, daˈrújemë
2nd	daˈrújesz	daˈrújece	daˈrújeta, daˈrújete
3rd	daˈrújù	daˈrújõ	—
Imperative	Singular	Plural	Dual
1st	—	ˈdarôùmä	ˈdarôùma, ˈdarôùmë
2nd	ˈdarôù	ˈdarôùce	ˈdarôùta, ˈdarôùte
3rd	ˈdarôù	—	—
active present participle	daraˈjõcy, darˈõcy		
present adverbial participle	darúˈjõcë		
past participle	darôˈwóny		
Verbal noun	darôˈwanjé		
Past forms	Singular	Plural	Dual
Past forms	Masculine: daˈrôwôùl Feminine: darôˈwa Neuter: daˈrôwalô	Virile: daˈrôwaly Non-virile: daˈrôwale	Virile: daˈrôwa Non-virile: daˈrôwale

Class III2D
Infinitive
daˈrac "to gift"
Present tense	Singular	Plural	Dual
1st	ˈdarújã	daˈrújemë	daˈrújema, daˈrújemë
2nd	daˈrújesz	daˈrújecë	daˈrújeta, daˈrújete
3rd	daˈrújù	daˈrújõ	—
Imperative	Singular	Plural	Dual
1st	—	ˈdarôùmä	ˈdarôùma, ˈdarôùmë
2nd	ˈdarôù	ˈdarôùce	ˈdarôùta, ˈdarôùte
3rd	ˈdarôù	—	—
active present participle	daraˈjõcy, daˈrõcy		
present adverbial participle	darúˈjõcë		
past participle	daˈróny		
Verbal noun	daˈranjé		
Past forms	Singular	Plural	Dual
Past forms	Masculine: daˈrôùl Feminine: daˈra Neuter: daˈralô	Virile: daraly Non-virile: daˈrale	Virile: daˈra Non-virile: daˈrale

==== Class IV ====
Class IV verbs end in ⟨-yc, -ëc⟩. Class IVAa comprises verbs whose stems end in ⟨p, b, f, w, m, n, k, zg, j⟩, and IVAb in the remaining consonants.

- IVAa: ˈkúpjyc > ˈkúpjã
- IVAb: ˈrzëcëc (pronounced ˈrzëcec) > ˈrzúcã

Class IVAa
Infinitive
ˈczinjic "to make, to do"
Present tense	Singular	Plural	Dual
1st	ˈczinjã	ˈczinjymë	ˈczinjyma, ˈczinjymë
2nd	ˈczinjysz	ˈczinjyce	ˈczinjita, ˈczinjïtä
3rd	ˈczinjy	ˈczinjõ	—
Imperative	Singular	Plural	Dual
1st	—	cziˈnjymë	cziˈnjima, cziˈnjimë
2nd	ˈczinji	cziˈnjice	cziˈnjita, cziˈnjite
3rd	ˈczinji	—	—
active present participle	cziˈnjõcy		
present adverbial participle	ˈczinjõcë		
past participle	czyˈnjôni		
Verbal noun	cziˈnjênjé		
Past forms	Singular	Plural	Dual
Past forms	Masculine: ˈczinjél Feminine: cziˈnjyla Neuter: ˈczinjilô	Virile: ˈczinjily Non-virile: ˈczinjile	Virile: ˈczinjila Non-virile: ˈczinjile

Class IVAb
Infinitive
ˈmlôcëc "to thresh"
Present tense	Singular	Plural	Dual
1st	ˈmlócã	ˈmlócymë	ˈmlócyma, ˈmlócymë
2nd	ˈmlócysz	ˈmlócyce	ˈmlócyta, ˈmlócite
3rd	ˈmlócy	ˈmlócõ	—
Imperative	Singular	Plural	Dual
1st	—	mlôˈcëmë	mlôˈcëma, mlôˈcëmë
2nd	ˈmlôcë	mlôˈcëce	mlôˈcëta, mlôˈcëte
3rd	ˈmlôcë	—	—
active present participle	mlóˈcõcy		
present adverbial participle	ˈmlócõcë		
past participle	mlóˈcôny		
Verbal noun	mlóˈcênjé		
Past forms	Singular	Plural	Dual
Past forms	Masculine: ˈmlócél Feminine: mlóˈcëla Neuter: ˈmlócëlô	Virile: ˈmlócëly Non-virile: ˈmlócële	Virile: ˈmlócëla Non-virile: ˈmlócële

Class IVBa preserves softening of the final consonant, whereas IVBb does not.

Class IVBa
Infinitive
ˈklëczec "to kneel"
Present tense	Singular	Plural	Dual
1st	ˈklëczã	ˈklëczymë	ˈklëczyma, ˈklëczymë
2nd	ˈklëczysz	ˈklëczyce	ˈklëczyta, klȧčyte
3rd	ˈklëczy	ˈklëczõ	—
Imperative	Singular	Plural	Dual
1st	—	klë'czimë	klë'czima, klë'czimë
2nd	ˈklëczi	klë'czice	klë'czita, klë'czite
3rd	ˈklëczi	—	—
active present participle	klëˈczõcy		
present adverbial participle	klëˈczõcë		
past participle	klëˈczaly		
Verbal noun	klëˈczênjé		
Past forms	Singular	Plural	Dual
Past forms	Masculine: ˈklëczôùl Feminine: ˈklëcza Neuter: ˈklëczalô	Virile: ˈklëczely Non-virile: ˈklëczale	Virile: ˈklëcza Non-virile: ˈklëczale

Class IVBb
Infinitive
ˈsêdzec "to sit"
Present tense	Singular	Plural	Dual
1st	ˈsêdzã	ˈsêdzymë	ˈsêdzyma, ˈsêdzymë
2nd	ˈsêdzysz	ˈsêdzyce	ˈsêdzyta, ˈsêdzyte
3rd	ˈsêdzy	ˈsêdzõ	—
Imperative	Singular	Plural	Dual
1st	—	sêˈdzëmë	sêˈdzëma, sêˈdzëmë
2nd	ˈsêdzë	sêˈdzëce	sêˈdzëta, sêˈdzëte
3rd	ˈsêdzë	—	—
active present participle	sêˈdzõcy		
present adverbial participle	sêˈdzõcë		
past participle	sêdzˈaly		
Verbal noun	sêˈdzênjé		
Past forms	Singular	Plural	Dual
Past forms	Masculine: ˈsêdzôùl Feminine: ˈsêdza Neuter: ˈsêdzalô	Virile: ˈsêdzely Non-virile: ˈsêdzale	Virile: ˈsêdza Non-virile: ˈsêdzale

==== Class V ====
This class comprises nine base verbs (and their prefixed derivatives) which had the ending -m in the first person singular.

Va includes verbs whose present tense roots do not have any special stem-forming element. Vb includes verbs with reduplication. Vc includes the future tense of bˈëc. Vd includes verbs with a nasal infix.

- Va: ˈjêsc > ˈjém
- Vb: ˈdac > ˈdóm
- Vc: ˈbóm
- Vd: ˈmôc > ˈmõżesz/ˈmõsz

Class Va
Infinitive
ˈbëc "to be"
Present tense	Singular	Plural	Dual
1st	ˈjêm	ˈjêsmë	ˈjêsma, ˈjêsmë
2nd	ˈjês	ˈjêsce	ˈjêsta, ˈjêste
3rd	ˈjê, ˈjêsta	ˈsõ	—

Class Va
Infinitive
ˈjêsc "to eat"
Present tense	Singular	Plural	Dual
1st	ˈjém	ˈjésmë	ˈjésma, ˈjésmë
2nd	ˈjés	ˈjésce	ˈjésta, ˈjéste
3rd	ˈjé	ˈjêdzõ	—
Imperative	Singular	Plural	Dual
1st	—	ˈjémë	ˈjéma, ˈjémë
2nd	ˈjés	ˈjésce	ˈjésta, ˈjéste
3rd	ˈjés	—	—
active present participle	jêˈdzõcy		
present adverbial participle	jaˈdõce		
past participle	jadly		
Verbal noun	jêˈdzênjé		
Past forms	Singular	Plural	Dual
Past forms	Masculine: ˈjod Feminine: ˈjadla Neuter: ˈjadlô	Virile: ˈjêdly Non-virile: ˈjadle	Virile: ˈjadla Non-virile: ˈjadle

Class Va
Infinitive
ˈwjêdzec "to know"
Present tense	Singular	Plural	Dual
1st	ˈwjém	ˈwjésmë	ˈwjésma, ˈwjésmë
2nd	ˈwjés	ˈwjésce	ˈwjésta, ˈwjéste
3rd	ˈwjé	ˈwjêdzõ	—
Imperative	Singular	Plural	Dual
1st	—	ˈwjémë	ˈwjéma, ˈwjémë
2nd	ˈwjé	ˈwjéce	ˈwjéta, ˈwjéte
3rd	ˈwjé	—	—
active present participle	wjêˈdzõcy		
present adverbial participle	wjêˈdzõcë		
past participle	wjêˈdzly		
Verbal noun	wjêˈdzênjé		
Past forms	Singular	Plural	Dual
Past forms	Masculine: ˈwjêdzôùl Feminine: ˈwjêdza Neuter: ˈwjêdzalô	Virile: ˈwjêdzely Non-virile: ˈwjêdzale	Virile: ˈwjêdza Non-virile: ˈwjêdzale

Class Va
Infinitive
ˈmjêc "to have"
Present tense	Singular	Plural	Dual
1st	ˈmóm	ˈmómë	ˈmóma, ˈmómë
2nd	ˈmos	ˈmoce	ˈmota, ˈmote
3rd	ˈmo	ˈmajõ, ˈmõ	—
Imperative	Singular	Plural	Dual
1st	—	ˈmjémë	ˈmjéma, ˈmjémë
2nd	ˈmjé	ˈmjéce	ˈmjéta, ˈmjéte
3rd	ˈmjé	—	—
active present participle	maˈjõcy		
present adverbial participle	maˈjõcë		
past participle	ˈmjóny		
Verbal noun	ˈmjênjé		
Past forms	Singular	Plural	Dual
Past forms	Masculine: ˈmjˈôùl Feminine: ˈmja Neuter: ˈmjalô	Virile: ˈmjêly Non-virile: ˈmjale	Virile: ˈmja Non-virile: ˈmjale

Class Vc
ˈbëc (future tense)
Future tense	Singular	Plural	Dual
1st	ˈbóm, ˈbõdã	ˈbómë	ˈbóma, ˈbómë
2nd	ˈbõsz	ˈbõce	ˈbõta, ˈbõte
3rd	ˈbõ	bõdõ	—
active present participle	bãˈdõcy		
present adverbial participle	bãˈdõcë		
Verbal noun	ˈbëcé		
Past forms	Singular	Plural	Dual
Past forms	Masculine: ˈbél Feminine: ˈbëla Neuter: ˈbëlô	Virile: ˈbëly Non-virile: ˈbële	Virile: ˈbëla Non-virile: ˈbële

|}

=== Verb stress alternations ===
Like nouns, verbs can have different stress patterns. The base form of the verb is the infinitive.

Affixless polysyllabic simple verbs have stress on the penultimate syllable of the infinitive, except drëˈżêc ("to shiver, to shake"); verbs whose stem ends in a consonant + eding ⟨-ac⟩ belonging to class III2D (⟨-újã⟩ in the first person present) always stress the first syllable, and all verbs ending in ⟨-oc⟩ can be stressed either on the penultimate or the final syllable.

Prefixed verbs maintain the position of the stress as in the prefixless one, except for drëˈżêc which can have a left-shifting stress when prefixed, e.g. ˈzadrëżêc.

Prefixed derived from monosyllabic verbs always show the stress on the very first syllable of the infinitive, except verbs ending in ⟨-nõc⟩, which show two alternative stresses if they are composed of with a polysyllabic prefix and three other verbs.

- jêsc ("to eat") > ˈnjêdôjêsc ("to not finish eating")
- ˈrznõc > ˈrôzderznõc and rôzˈderznõc

All perfective verbs and some imperfective verbs prefixed with ⟨vë-⟩ have stress on the prefix.

Present tense forms can have fixed and mobile stress patterns.

The basic forms for the present tense is the first person singular, which always has stress on the initial syllable, with one exception, drëˈżêc ("to shiver, to shake"), which has fixed stress on the first syllable of the inflectional suffix. All other form have the stress on the last syllable before the inflectional suffix. Class III2A (verbs in ⟨-ac⟩) show a regular stress shift onto the inflectional suffix in the third person plural.

drëˈżêc ("to shiver, to shake") and perfective verbs prefixed with ⟨wë-⟩ break this rule, and non-syllabic verb stems stick to this rule if they are composed with two prefixes or a bisyllabic prefix but have alternative forms with fixed stress. Only mobile stress is possible if the first prefix in such a verb is the negation particle ⟨njê-⟩.

Athematical verbs with one prefixed syllable are regular, and only the third person plural has enough syllables for a stress shift. However, in combination with two prefixed syllables, they behave as if the prefix consists of one syllable, so the stress is fixed except in the third person plural.

Non-prefixed verbs in the first person singular may shift the stress to the pronoun ⟨jo⟩ ("I") if it is before the verb (see Lorentz par 112). This stress shift is rare in monosyllabic present forms with a V1, but there are many exceptions

Verbs also display three types of alternations.

The past tense of verbs in ending in ⟨-nãc⟩ emphasize the feminine singular ending, in the other forms they withdraw the accent to the first syllable.

- ˈcygnón > cygˈnã

A general rule for the past tense forms is that the accent in all forms is withdrawn as much as possible.

=== Verb vowel alternations ===
If the infinitive has ⟨o, ó, é, y, ú, õ, ˈôù, ˈôj ŭ⟩ as the stem vowel, (in class IA:Vsd), then there is no alternation, except for all verbs of class IA (except the stem ⟨-jõsc⟩ ("to carry, to bear") and a few class IIC verbs.

Class IA verbs show regular ⟨o, ó, é, y, ú, õ, ˈôù, ˈôj ŭ⟩ ~ ⟨a, ô, e, ë, i, ã, ê, aj⟩ / ⟨ôˈù, ej, ĭ⟩ alternations; ⟨o, ó, é, y, ú, õ, ˈôù, ˈôj, ŭ⟩ in the infinitive and ⟨a, ô, e, ë, i, ã, ê, aj⟩ / ⟨ôˈù, ej, ĭ⟩ everywhere else except the past masculine singular.

Class IIC verbs with any alternation (not all have it) change ⟨o, ó, é, y, ú, õ, ˈôù, ˈôj, ŭ⟩ into ⟨a, ô, e, ë, i, ã, ê, aj⟩ / ⟨ôˈù, ej, ĭ⟩ in the imperative and often in all l-forms where /-l/ isnˈt the final phoneme of the word.

If verb has ⟨a, ô, e, ë, i, ã, ê, aj⟩ / ⟨ôˈù, ej, ĭ⟩ as a stem vowel or a single vowel, verb classes IA (except lˈêsc ("to climb")), II, IIIA2, III2Ab, III2B, III2C, III2D, and IVB do not have a ⟨o, ó, é, y, ú, õ, ˈôù, ˈôj ŭ⟩ ~ ⟨a, ô, e, ë, y, ã, ê, aj⟩ / ⟨ôˈù, ej, ĭ⟩ or ⟨a, ô, e, ë, y, ã, ê, aj⟩ / ⟨ôˈù, ej, ĭ⟩~⟨o, ó, é, y, ú, õ, ˈôù, ˈôj, ŭ⟩ alternation in the forms with an inflectional suffix vowel, but all other verbs are split into alternating and non-alternating (with ⟨o, ó, é, y, ú, õ, ˈôù, ˈôj ŭ⟩ in the present and l-forms, and n-forms in the verbal noun) subclasses.

The past tense always shows ⟨o, ó, é, y, ú, õ, ˈôù, ˈôj, ŭ⟩ in the masculine singular, ⟨a, ô, e, ë, i, ã, ê, aj⟩ / ⟨ôˈù, ej, ĭ⟩ in all other cases except in classes IAa and IAc, where alternative forms with ⟨a, ô, e, ë, i, ã, ê, aj⟩ / ⟨ôˈù, ej, ĭ⟩ can be found. This results in regular ⟨o, ó, é, y, ú, õ, ˈôù, ˈôj, ŭ⟩ ~ ⟨a, ô, e, ë, y, ã, ê, aj⟩ / ⟨ôˈù, ej, ĭ⟩ alternations.

- ⟨ôù~a⟩ before ⟨l⟩ in IB, IC, III1A1f, III1B, III1C, III1D, III1E, III2, IVB, IVC
- ⟨ó~a⟩ before ⟨n⟩ in IIB, IIC, III1A2a
- ⟨é~ë⟩, ⟨é~y⟩, ⟨ó~ù⟩, ⟨ó~ë⟩, and ⟨ó~ô⟩ before ⟨l⟩
- ⟨é~ë⟩ in III1A1b and IVAb
- ⟨é~y⟩ in III1A1a and IVAa
- ⟨ó~ù⟩ in III1A1c
- ⟨ó~ë⟩ in III1A1d
- ⟨ó~ô⟩ in III1A1e

The infinitive can have either ⟨o, ó, é, y, ú, õ, ˈôù, ˈôj, ŭ⟩ or ⟨a, ô, e, ë, i, ã, ê, aj⟩ / ⟨ôˈù, ej, ĭ⟩ in the final syllable. III1A1a, III1A1b, III1A1c, III1A1d, IVAa, and IVAb, the inflectional suffix vowel (or only vowel in verbs with only one) is conditioned by the preceding consonant.

Classes III1A1a-e and III1A2c show the V2 of the infinitive for ⟨c⟩ forms of the verbal nouns. Class III1A2a shows ⟨o, ó, é, y, ú, õ, ˈôù, ˈôj, ŭ⟩~⟨a, ô, e, ë, i, ã, ê, aj⟩ / ⟨ôˈù, ej, ĭ⟩ alternation. Classes IC, III1C, III1D, III1E, III2Aa, III2C, III2D, and IVC show the ⟨a, ô, e, ë, i, ã, ê, aj⟩ / ⟨ôˈù, ej, ĭ⟩ of the infinitive for ⟨-n⟩ forms. Class III1A2b shows ⟨o, ó, é, y, ú, õ, ˈôù, ˈôj, ŭ⟩~⟨a, ô, e, ë, i, ã, ê, aj⟩ / ⟨ôˈù, ej, ĭ⟩ alternation. Classes show III2Ab and IVB show ⟨ë~ê⟩ alternations and not ⟨a, ô, e, ë, i, ã, ê, aj⟩ / ⟨ôˈù, ej, ĭ⟩~⟨o, ó, é, y, ú, õ, ˈôù, ˈôj, ŭ⟩ since ⟨ë⟩ is the archiphoneme of /ə/ and /ɛ/ in this position; The other classes have ⟨-ˈênjé) without any rule.

In classes I, II, III1A2b, III1Ca, III1Cb, III1D, III1A2a, IVAa, IVAb, IVBa, and IVBb the inflectional suffix vowels ⟨ë⟩ and ⟨y⟩ in the imperative are conditioned by the preceding consonant. The imperative and present tense acquire a special treatment only when there is one vowel in the verb.

In the following verb classes the vowel show regular alternations in the imperative on the basis of the present tense forms if it is the only vowel in the verb:

- III1A1a: ⟨y~i⟩
- III1A1b: ⟨ë~i⟩
- III1A1c: ⟨ù~ú⟩
- III1A1d: ⟨ë~ú⟩
- III1A1e: ⟨ô~ó⟩
- III1B: ⟨ˈê~ˈé⟩

Classes III2Ab and III2B show a regular alternation ⟨a, ô, e, ë, i, ã, ê, aj⟩ / ⟨ôˈù, ej, ĭ⟩~⟨o, ó, é, y, ú, õ, ˈôù, ˈôj, ŭ⟩ (⟨ˈê~éˈ⟩, the former in the present tense, the latter in the imperative.

Two classes of verbs have two sets of alternations:

- IB: ⟨a~ôù, ó, o⟩ and /ô~ó/
- III1B: /a~ôù, ó, o/ and ⟨ˈê~ˈé⟩

The second type of alternations:

Conditioned by final stem consonant ⟨t, d, s, z, n, r, l⟩. Classes IB, III1B, and III2B show this alternation.

The third type of alternation is rare.

== See also ==
- Kashubian grammar

== Bibliography ==
- Mikkola, Jooseppi Julius (1897). Къ изученію кашубскихъ говоровъ: Нѣсколько замѣтокъ по кашубскимъ говорамъ въ сѣверо-восточной Помераніи. Императорская академія наукъ.
- Lorentz, Friedrich (1903). Slovinzische Grammatik.
- Lorentz, Friedrich (1905). Slovinzische Texte.
- Lorentz, Friedrich (1908). Slowinzisches Wörterbuch: erster Teil. Vol. 1, A–O. St. Petersburg: Buchdruckerei der Kaiserlichen Akademie der Wissenschaften.
- Lorentz, Friedrich (1912). Slowinzisches Wörterbuch: zweiter Teil. Vol. 2, P–Z. St. Petersburg: Buchdruckerei der Kaiserlichen Akademie der Wissenschaften.
- Rudnicki, Mikołaj (1913). "Przyczynki do gramatyki i słownika narzecza słowińskiego". materyały i Prace Komisyi językowej. IV. Kraków.
- Stokhof, W.A.L. (1973). The Extinct East-Slovincian Kluki-Dialect, Phonology and Morphology. The Hague: Mouton.
- Sobierajski, Zenon; Trawińska, Maria (1997). Słownik gwarowy tzw. Słowińców kaszubskich. Vol. 1, A–C (1 ed.). Warsaw: Sławistyczny ośrodek wydawniczy.
