= Non-numerical words for quantities =

Words that denote non-numerical quantities

The English language has a number of words that denote specific or approximate quantities that are themselves not numbers. Along with numerals, and special-purpose words like some, any, much, more, every, few, several, and all, they are quantifiers. Quantifiers are a kind of determiner and occur in many constructions with other determiners, like articles: e.g., two dozen or more than a score. Scientific non-numerical quantities are represented as SI units.

== List of non-numerical quantities ==
Name	Quantity	Description
Brace	2	An old term of venery, meaning means ‘a pair of [some animal, especially birds] caught in the hunt’. Also a measure of length, originally representing a person's outstretched arms.
Couple	2	A set of two of items of a type
Single	1	One thing that is alone or separate from everything else.
Century	100	Primarily denotes one hundred years, but occasionally used, especially in the context of sport, to refer to something consisting of one hundred, as in a 100-mile race or 100 points.
Dozen	12	A collection of twelve things or units from Old French dozaine "a dozen, a number of twelve" in various usages, from doze (12c.)
Baker's dozen	13	From the notion that a baker would include an extra item in a batch of twelve so as not to be accused of shortchanging a customer
Half-dozen	6	Six of something
Decade	10	Primarily denotes ten years, but occasionally refers to ten of something
Duo	2	In reference to people engaged in an endeavor together, as in musical performance (other words denote three or more people in the same context: trio, quartet, etc.)
Grand	1,000	Slang for a thousand of some unit of currency, such as dollars or pounds.
Gross	144	Twelve dozen
Score	20	Presumably from the practice, in counting sheep or large herds of cattle, of counting orally from one to twenty, and making a score or notch on a stick, before proceeding to count the next twenty. A distance of twenty yards in ancient archery and gunnery.
Threescore	60	Three score (3x20)
Large	1,000	Slang for one thousand
Myriad	10,000	Loosely refers to a very large quantity
Pair	2	Often in reference to complementary units, such as male and female or left and right
Trio	3	Referring to people working or collaborating especially in musical performance
Quartet	4	Referring to people working or collaborating especially in musical performance; also: Quintet, Sextet, Septet, Octet
Great gross	1,728	A dozen gross (12x144)
Hat-trick	3	The achievement of, a generally positive feat, three times in a game, or another achievement based on the number three
Small gross	120	Ten dozen (10x12)
Great hundred	120	Ten dozen (10x12) or six score (6x20), also known as long-hundred or twelfty
Ton	100	One hundred points in the sport of Darts.
None, nil, zilch	0	Zero
Lakh	100,000	Indian numbering system: One hundred thousand
Crore	10,000,000	Indian numbering system: ten million
Arab	1,000,000,000	Indian numbering system: billion
Kharab	100,000,000,000	Indian numbering system: hundred billion
Nil	10^{13}	Indian numbering system: ten trillion
Padma	10^{15}	Indian numbering system: quadrillion
Shankh	10^{17}	Indian numbering system: hundred quadrillion
Mole	~602 sextillion	6.02214076×10^{23}, widely used in chemistry for the amount of substance

== See also ==
- Collective numbers
- wiktionary: collective numeral
