= English numerals =

Names of numbers in English

Arabic numerals set in Source Sans

English number words include numerals and various words derived from them, as well as a large number of words borrowed from other languages.

== Cardinal numbers ==
Cardinal numbers refer to the size of a group. In English, these words are numerals.

0	zero (nought)	10	ten		
1	one	11	eleven		
2	two	12	twelve	20	twenty
3	three	13	thirteen	30	thirty
4	four	14	fourteen	40	forty
5	five	15	fifteen	50	fifty
6	six	16	sixteen	60	sixty
7	seven	17	seventeen	70	seventy
8	eight	18	eighteen	80	eighty
9	nine	19	nineteen	90	ninety

If a number is in the range 21 to 99, and the second digit is not zero, the number is typically written as two words separated by a hyphen.

21	twenty-one
25	twenty-five
32	thirty-two
58	fifty-eight
64	sixty-four
79	seventy-nine
83	eighty-three
99	ninety-nine

In English, the hundreds are perfectly regular, except that the word hundred remains in its singular form regardless of the number preceding it.

100	one hundred
200	two hundred
...	...
900	nine hundred

So too are the thousands, with the number of thousands followed by the word "thousand". The number one thousand may be written 1 000 or 1000 or 1,000; larger numbers are written for example 10 000 or 10,000 for ease of reading. European languages that use the comma as a decimal separator may correspondingly use the period as a thousands separator. As a result, some style guides recommend avoidance of the comma (,) as either separator and the use of the period (.) only as a decimal point. Thus one-half would be written 0.5 in decimal, base ten notation, and fifty thousand as 50 000, and not 50.000 nor 50,000 nor 50000.

1,000	one thousand
2,000	two thousand
...	...
10,000	ten thousand or (rarely used) a myriad, which usually means an indefinitely large number.
11,000	eleven thousand
...	...
20,000	twenty thousand
21,000	twenty-one thousand
30,000	thirty thousand
85,000	eighty-five thousand
100,000	one hundred thousand or one lakh (1,00,000) (Indian English)
999,000	nine hundred and ninety-nine thousand (inclusively British English, Irish English, Australian English, and New Zealand English) nine hundred ninety-nine thousand (American English) nine lac ninety-nine thousand (Indian English)
1,000,000	one million or ten lacs (10,00,000) (Indian English)
10,000,000	ten million or one crore (1,00,00,000) (Indian English)

In American usage four-digit numbers are often named using multiples of "hundred" and combined with tens and ones: "eleven hundred three", "twelve hundred twenty-five", "forty-seven hundred forty-two", or "ninety-nine hundred ninety-nine". In British usage, this style is common for multiples of 100 between 1,000 and 2,000 (e.g., 1,500 as "fifteen hundred") but not for higher numbers.

Many people pronounce four-digit numbers with non-zero tens and ones as pairs of two-digit numbers without saying "hundred" and inserting "oh" for zero tens: "twenty-six fifty-nine" or "forty-one oh five". This usage probably evolved from the distinctive usage for years; "nineteen-eighty-one", or from four-digit numbers used in the American telephone numbering system which were originally two letters followed by a number followed by a four-digit number, later by a three-digit number followed by the four-digit number. It is avoided for numbers less than 2500 if the context may mean confusion with time of day: "ten ten" or "twelve oh four".

Intermediate numbers are read differently depending on their use. Their typical naming occurs when the numbers are used for counting. Another way is for when they are used as labels. The second column method is used much more often in American English than British English. The third column is used in British English but rarely in American English (although the use of the second and third columns is not necessarily directly interchangeable between the two regional variants). In other words, British English and American English can seemingly agree, but it depends on a specific situation (in this example, bus numbers).

	Common British vernacular	Common American vernacular	Common British vernacular
	"How many marbles do you have?"	"What is your house number?"	"Which bus goes to the High Street?"
101	"A hundred and one."	"One-oh-one."; Here, "oh" is used for the digit zero.	"One-oh-one."
109	"A hundred and nine."	"One-oh-nine."	"One-oh-nine."
110	"A hundred and ten."	"One-ten."	"One-one-oh."
117	"A hundred and seventeen."	"One-seventeen."	"One-one-seven."
120	"A hundred and twenty."	"One-twenty."	"One-two-oh", "One-two-zero."
152	"A hundred and fifty-two."	"One-fifty-two."	"One-five-two."
208	"Two hundred and eight."	"Two-oh-eight."	"Two-oh-eight."
394	"Three hundred and ninety-four."	"Three-ninety-four."	"Three-ninety-four." or "Three-nine-four."

Note: When a cheque (or check) is written, the number 100 is always written "one hundred". It is never "a hundred".

In American English, many students are taught not to use the word and anywhere in the whole part of a number, so it is not used before the tens and ones. It is instead used as a verbal delimiter when dealing with compound numbers. Thus, instead of "three hundred and seventy-three", "three hundred seventy-three" would be said. Despite this rule, some Americans use the and in reading numbers containing tens and ones as an alternative.

=== Very large numbers ===
For numbers above a million, there are three main systems used to form numbers in English. (For the use of prefixes such as kilo- for a thousand, mega- for a million, milli- for a thousandth, etc. see SI units.) These are:

- the long scale – designates a system of numeric names formerly used in British English, but now obsolete, in which a billion is used for a million million (and similarly, with trillion, quadrillion etc., the prefix denoting the power of a million); and a thousand million is sometimes called a milliard. This system is still used in several other European languages. There is some favour for this scale in astronomy, due to the issue of the vastness of the Universe.
- the short scale – always used in American English and almost always in British English since the politically ordained formal adoption of this scale in the 1970s – designates a system of numeric names in which a thousand million is called a billion, and the word milliard is not used.
- the Indian numbering system, used widely across Indian subcontinent.

Many people have no direct experience of manipulating numbers this large, and many non-American readers may interpret billion as 10^{12} (even if they are young enough to have been taught otherwise at school); moreover, usage of the "long" billion is standard in some non-English-speaking countries. For these reasons, defining the word may be advisable when writing for the public.

Number notation	Power notation	Short scale	Long scale	Indian (or South Asian) English
1,000,000	10^{6}	one million	one million	ten lakh
1,000,000,000	10^{9}	one billion a thousand million	one milliard a thousand million	one hundred crore (one arab)
1,000,000,000,000	10^{12}	one trillion a thousand billion	one billion a million million	one lakh crore (ten kharab)
1,000,000,000,000,000	10^{15}	one quadrillion a thousand trillion	one billiard a thousand billion	ten crore crore (one padma)
1,000,000,000,000,000,000	10^{18}	one quintillion a thousand quadrillion	one trillion a million billion	ten thousand crore crore (ten shankh)
1,000,000,000,000,000,000,000	10^{21}	one sextillion a thousand quintillion	one trilliard a thousand trillion	one crore crore crore (one ankh)

The numbers past one trillion in the short scale, in ascending powers of 1000, are as follows: quadrillion, quintillion, sextillion, septillion, octillion, nonillion, decillion, undecillion, duodecillion, tredecillion, quattuordecillion, quindecillion, sexdecillion, septendecillion, octodecillion, novemdecillion and vigintillion (which is 10 to the 63rd power, or a one followed by 63 zeros). The highest number in this series listed in modern dictionaries is centillion, which is 10 to the 303rd power. The interim powers of one thousand between vigintillion and centillion do not have standardized names, nor do any higher powers, but there are many ad hoc extensions in use. The highest number listed in Robert Munafo's table of such unofficial names is milli-millillion, which was coined as a name for 10 to the 3,000,003rd power.

The googolplex was often cited as the largest named number in English. If a googol is ten to the one hundredth power, then a googolplex is one followed by a googol of zeros (that is, ten to the power of a googol). There is the coinage, of very little use, of ten to the googolplex power, of the word googolplexplex.

The terms arab, kharab, padma and shankh are more commonly found in old books on Indian mathematics.

Here are some approximate composite large numbers in American English:

Quantity	Written	Pronounced
1,200,000	1.2 million	one point two million
3,000,000	3 million	three million
250,000,000	250 million	two hundred fifty million
6,400,000,000	6.4 billion	six-point four billion
23,380,000,000	23.38 billion	twenty-three-point three eight billion

Often, large numbers are written with (preferably non-breaking) half-spaces or thin spaces separating the thousands (and, sometimes, with normal spaces or apostrophes) instead of commas—to ensure that confusion is not caused in countries where a decimal comma is used. Thus, a million is often written 1 000 000. In some areas, a point (. or ·) may also be used as a thousands separator, but then the decimal separator must be a comma (,). In English the point (.) is used as the decimal separator, and the comma (,) as the thousands separator.

== Special names ==
Some numbers have special names in addition to their regular names, most depending on context.

- 0:
  - zero: formal scientific usage
  - nought: mostly British usage, common in science to refer to subscript 0 indicating an initial state
  - naught: archaic term for nothingness, which may or may not be equivalent to the number; mostly American usage, old-fashioned spelling of nought
  - aught: proscribed but still occasionally used when a digit is 0 (as in "thirty-aught-six", the .30-06 Springfield rifle cartridge and by association guns that fire it). Aughts can also refer to the first decade of this century in American English, though it may not be universally understood.
  - oh: used when spelling numbers (like telephone, bank account, bus line [British: bus route]) but can cause confusion with the letter o if reading a mix of numbers and letters
  - nil: in general sport scores, British usage ("The score is two–nil.")
  - nothing: in general sport scores, American usage ("The score is two–nothing.")
  - null: to an object or idea related to nothingness. The 0th aleph number ($\aleph_0$) is pronounced "aleph-null".
  - love: in tennis, badminton, squash and similar sports (origin disputed, said by the Oxford English Dictionary to be from the idea that when one does a thing "for love", that is for no monetary gain, the word "love" implies "nothing". The previously held belief that it originated from French: l'œuf, lit. 'the egg', due to its shape, is no longer widely accepted)
  - zilch, nada (from Spanish), zip: used informally when stressing nothingness; this is true especially in combination with one another ("You know nothing—zero, zip, nada, zilch!"); American usage
  - nix: also used as a verb; mostly American usage
  - cypher / cipher: archaic, from French chiffre, in turn from Arabic sifr, meaning zero
  - goose egg (informal)
  - duck (used in cricket when a batsman is dismissed without scoring)
  - blank the half of a domino tile with no pips
- 1:
  - ace in certain sports and games, as in tennis or golf, indicating success with one stroke, and the face of a die, playing card or domino half with one pip
  - birdie in golf denotes one stroke less than par, and bogey, one stroke more than par
  - solo
  - unit
  - linear the degree of a polynomial is 1; also for explicitly denoting the first power of a unit: linear metre
  - unity in mathematics
  - protagonist first actor in theatre of Ancient Greece, similarly Proto-Isaiah and proton
- 2:
  - couple
  - brace, from Old French "arms" (the plural of arm), as in "what can be held in two arms".
  - pair
  - deuce the face of a die, playing card or domino half with two pips
  - eagle in golf denotes two strokes less than par
  - duo
  - quadratic the degree of a polynomial is 2
    - also square or squared for denoting the second power of a unit: square metre or metre squared
  - penultimate, second from the end
  - deuteragonist second actor in theatre of Ancient Greece, similarly Deutero-Isaiah and deuteron
- 3:
  - trey the face of a die or playing card with three pips, a three-point field goal in basketball, nickname for the third carrier of the same personal name in a family
  - trio
  - trips: three-of-a-kind in a poker hand. a player has three cards with the same numerical value
  - cubic the degree of a polynomial is 3
    - also cube or cubed for denoting the third power of a unit: cubic metre or metre cubed
  - albatross in golf denotes three strokes less than par. Sometimes called double eagle
  - hat-trick or hat trick: achievement of three feats in sport or other contexts
  - antepenultimate third from the end
  - tritagonist third actor in theatre of Ancient Greece, similarly Trito-Isaiah and triton
  - turkey in bowling, three consecutive strikes
- 4:
  - cater: (rare) the face of a die or playing card with four pips
  - quartet
  - quartic or biquadratic the degree of a polynomial is 4
  - quad (short for quadruple or the like) several specialized sets of four, such as four of a kind in poker, a carburetor with four inputs, etc.,
  - condor in golf denotes four strokes less than par
  - preantepenultimate fourth from the end
- 5:
  - cinque or cinq (rare) the face of a die or playing card with five pips
  - quintet
  - nickel (informal American, from the value of the five-cent US nickel, but applied in non-monetary references)
  - quintic the degree of a polynomial is 5
  - quint (short for quintuplet or the like) several specialized sets of five, such as quintuplets, etc.
- 6:
  - half a dozen
  - sice (rare) the face of a die or playing card with six pips
  - sextet
  - sextic or hectic the degree of a polynomial is 6
- 7:
  - septet
  - septic or heptic the degree of a polynomial is 7
- 8:
  - octet
- 9:
  - nonet
- 10:
  - dime (informal American, from the value of the ten-cent US dime, but applied in non-monetary references)
  - decet
  - decade, used for years but also other groups of 10 as in rosary prayers or Braille symbols
- 11:
  - undecet
  - a banker's dozen
- 12:
  - duodecet
  - a dozen (first power of the duodecimal base), used mostly in commerce
- 13: a baker's dozen
- 20: a score (first power of the vigesimal base), nowadays archaic; famously used in the opening of the Gettysburg Address: "Four score and seven years ago..." The Number of the beast in the King James Bible is rendered "Six hundred threescore and six". Also in The Book of Common Prayer, Psalm 90 as used in the Burial Service—"The days of our age are threescore years and ten; ...."
- 25: a pony is a bet of £25 in British betting slang.
- 50: half-century, literally half of a hundred, usually used in cricket scores.
- 55: double-nickel (informal American)
- 60: a shock: historical commercial count, described as "three scores".
- 100:
  - A century, also used in cricket scores and in cycling for 100 miles.
  - A ton, in Commonwealth English, the speed of 100 mph or 100 km/h.
  - A small hundred or short hundred (archaic, see 120 below)
- 120:
  - A great hundred or long hundred (twelve tens; as opposed to the small hundred, i.e. 100 or ten tens), also called small gross (ten dozens), both archaic
  - Also sometimes referred to as duodecimal hundred, although that could literally also mean 144, which is twelve squared
- 144: a gross (a dozen dozens, second power of the duodecimal base), used mostly in commerce
- 500:
  - a ream, usually of paper.
  - a monkey is a bet of £500 in British betting slang.
- 1000:
  - a grand, colloquially used especially when referring to money, also in fractions and multiples, e.g. half a grand, two grand, etc. Grand can also be shortened to "G" in many cases.
  - K, originally from the abbreviation of kilo-, e.g. "He only makes $20K a year."
  - Millennium (plural: millennia), a period of one thousand years.
  - kilo- (Greek for "one thousand"), a decimal unit prefix in the Metric system denoting multiplication by "one thousand". For example: 1 kilometre = 1000 metres.
- 1728: a great gross (a dozen gross, third power of the duodecimal base), used historically in commerce
- 10,000: a myriad (a hundred hundred), commonly used in the sense of an indefinite very high number
- 100,000: a lakh (a hundred thousand), in Indian English
- 10,000,000: a crore (a hundred lakh), in Indian English and written as 10,000,000.
- 10^{100}: googol (1 followed by 100 zeros), used in mathematics
- 10^{googol}: googolplex (1 followed by a googol of zeros)
- 10^{googolplex}: googolplexplex (1 followed by a googolplex of zeros)

Combinations of numbers in most sports scores are read as in the following examples:

- 1–0 British English: one-nil; American English: one-nothing, one-zip, or one-zero
- 0–0 British English: nil-nil or nil all; American English: zero-zero or nothing-nothing, (occasionally scoreless or no score)
- 2–2 two-two or two all; American English also twos, two to two, even at two, or two up.

Naming conventions of Tennis scores (and related sports) are different from other sports.

The centuries of Italian culture have names in English borrowed from Italian:

- duecento "(one thousand and) two hundred" for the years 1200 to 1299, or approximately 13th century
- trecento 14th century
- quattrocento 15th century
- cinquecento 16th century
- seicento 17th century
- settecento 18th century
- ottocento 19th century
- novecento 20th century
- ventesimo 21st century

When reading numbers in a sequence, such as a telephone or serial number, British people will usually use the terms double followed by the repeated number. Hence 007 is double oh seven. Exceptions are the emergency telephone number 999, which is always nine nine nine and the apocalyptic "Number of the beast", which is always six six six. In the US, 911 (the US emergency telephone number) is usually read nine one one, while 9/11 (in reference to the September 11, 2001, attacks) is usually read nine eleven.

== Multiplicative adverbs and adjectives ==
A few numbers have specialised multiplicative numbers (adverbs), also called adverbial numbers, which express how many times some event happens:

one time	once
two times	twice
three times	thrice (largely obsolete)

Compare these specialist multiplicative numbers to express how many times some thing exists (adjectives):

×1	solitary, single	one-off, onefold	singular
×2	double	twofold	duplicate
×3	triple, treble	threefold	triplicate
×4	quadruple	fourfold	quadruplicate
×5	quintuple	fivefold	quintuplicate
×6	sextuple, hextuple	sixfold	sextuplicate, hextuplicate
×7	septuple, heptuple	sevenfold	septuplicate, heptuplicate
×100	centuple	hundredfold	centuplicate

English also has some multipliers and distributive numbers, such as singly.

== Negative numbers ==
The name of a negative number is the name of the corresponding positive number preceded by "minus" or (American English) "negative". Thus −5.2 is "minus five point two" or "negative five point two". For temperatures, North Americans colloquially say "below"—short for "below zero"—so a temperature of −5° is "five below" (in contrast, for example, to "two above" for 2°). This is occasionally used for emphasis when referring to several temperatures or ranges both positive and negative. This is particularly common in Canada where the use of Celsius in weather forecasting means that temperatures can regularly drift above and below zero at certain times of year.

== Ordinal numbers ==
Ordinal numbers refer to a position (also called index or rank) in a sequence. Common ordinals include:

0th	zeroth or (rarely) noughth (see below)	10th	tenth		
1st	first	11th	eleventh		
2nd	second	12th	twelfth	20th	twentieth
3rd	third	13th	thirteenth	30th	thirtieth
4th	fourth	14th	fourteenth	40th	fortieth
5th	fifth	15th	fifteenth	50th	fiftieth
6th	sixth	16th	sixteenth	60th	sixtieth
7th	seventh	17th	seventeenth	70th	seventieth
8th	eighth	18th	eighteenth	80th	eightieth
9th	ninth	19th	nineteenth	90th	ninetieth

Zeroth only has a meaning when counting starts with zero, which happens in a mathematical or computer science context. Ordinal numbers predate the invention of zero and positional notation.

Ordinal numbers such as 21st, 33rd, etc., are formed by combining a cardinal ten with an ordinal unit.

21st	twenty-first
25th	twenty-fifth
32nd	thirty-second
58th	fifty-eighth
64th	sixty-fourth
79th	seventy-ninth
83rd	eighty-third
99th	ninety-ninth

Higher ordinals are not often written in words, unless they are round numbers (thousandth, millionth, billionth). They are written with digits and letters as described below. Some rules should be borne in mind.

- The suffixes -th, -st, -nd and -rd and their superscript variants (0^{th}, 1^{st}, 2^{nd}, 3^{rd}, and 4^{th} and so on) are called Ordinal indicators.
- If the tens digit of a number is 1, then "th" is written after the number. Examples include 13th, 19th, 112th, and 9,311th.
- If the tens digit is not equal to 1, then the following table could be used:

If the units digit is:	0	1	2	3	4–9
This is written after the number	th	st	nd	rd	th

- For example: 2nd, 7th, 20th, 23rd, 52nd, 135th, and 301st.

These ordinal abbreviations are actually hybrid contractions of a numeral and a word. 1st is "1" + "st" from "first". Similarly, "nd" is used for "second" and "rd" for "third". In the legal field and in some older publications, the ordinal abbreviation for "second" and "third" is simply "d" or "^{nd}".

- For example: 42d, 33d, 23d.

NB: "d" still often denotes "second" and "third" in the numeric designations of units in the US armed forces, for example, 533d Squadron, and in legal citations for the second and third series of case reporters.

== Dates ==
There are a number of ways to read years. The following table offers a list of valid pronunciations and alternate pronunciations for any given year of the Gregorian calendar and Julian calendar.

Year	Most common pronunciation method	Alternative methods
1 BC	(The year) One BC	(The year) One BCE (Note: Before the Common era.)
1	The year One	(The year) One CE (Note: of the Common era.); AD One (Note: Anno Domini One ("In the year One of our Lord") is sometimes written 1 AD.)
235	Two thirty-five	Two-three-five; Two hundred (and) thirty-five
911	Nine eleven	Nine-one-one; Nine hundred (and) eleven
999	Nine ninety-nine	Nine-nine-nine; Nine hundred (and) ninety-nine
1000	One thousand	Ten hundred 1K
1004	One thousand (and) four	Ten oh-four
1010	Ten ten	One thousand (and) ten
1050	Ten fifty	One thousand (and) fifty
1225	Twelve twenty-five	One-two-two-five; One thousand, two hundred (and) twenty-five Twelve-two-five
1900	Nineteen hundred	One thousand, nine hundred Nineteen aught
1901	Nineteen oh-one	Nineteen hundred (and) one One thousand, nine hundred (and) one Nineteen aught one
1919	Nineteen nineteen	Nineteen hundred (and) nineteen One thousand, nine hundred (and) nineteen
1999	Nineteen ninety-nine	Nineteen hundred (and) ninety-nine One thousand, nine hundred (and) ninety-nine
2000	Two thousand	Twenty hundred Two triple-oh Y2K
2001	Two thousand (and) one	Twenty oh-one Twenty hundred (and) one Two double-oh-one Two oh-oh-one
2009	Two thousand (and) nine	Twenty oh-nine Twenty hundred (and) nine Two double-oh-nine Two oh-oh-nine
2010	Twenty ten	Twenty hundred (and) ten Two-oh-one-oh; Two thousand (and) ten

Twelve thirty-four would be the norm on both sides of the Atlantic for the year 1234. The years 2000 to 2009 are most often read as two thousand, two thousand (and) one and the like by both British and American speakers. For years after 2009, twenty eleven, twenty fourteen, etc. are more common, even in years earlier than 2009 BC/BCE. Likewise, the years after 1009 (until 1099) are also read in the same manner (e.g. 1015 is either ten fifteen or, rarely, one thousand fifteen). Some Britons read years within the 1000s to 9000s BC/BCE in the American manner, that is, 1234 BC is read as twelve (hundred and) thirty-four BC, while 2400 BC can be read as either two thousand four hundred or twenty four hundred BC.

== Collective numbers ==
Collective numbers are numbers that refer to a group of a specific size. Words like "pair" and "dozen" are common in English, though most are formally derived from Greek and Latin numerals, as follows:

Group Size	Greek-derived	Colloquial	Music
1	monad		solo
2	dyad, duad	pair, twin	duo, duet
3	triad	trio, triplet	trio
4	tetrad		quartet
5	pentad		quintet
6	hexad	half-dozen	sextet
7	heptad, hebdomad		septet
8	octad, ogdoad		octet
9	nonad, ennead		nonet
10	decad, decade		
11	hendecad		
12	dodecad, duodecade	dozen	
1000	chiliad		

Although somewhat antiquated, English has several other collective numbers such as brace (2), score (20), and gross (144).

Score is perhaps the most famous of these, widely recognized in the USA due to Abraham Lincoln's historic Gettysburg Address which begins "Four score and seven years ago..."

=== Tuples ===
A tuple is a finite sequence (or ordered list) of numbers.

Tuple length, $n$	Name	Alternative names
0	empty tuple	null tuple / empty sequence / unit / none left
1	monuple	single / singleton / monad
2	couple	double / ordered pair / two-ple / twin / dual / duad / dyad / twosome
3	triple	treble / triplet / triad / ordered triple / threesome
4	quadruple	quad / tetrad / quartet / quadruplet
5	quintuple	pentuple / quint / pentad
6	sextuple	hextuple / hexad
7	septuple	heptuple / heptad
8	octuple	octa / octet / octad / octuplet
9	nonuple	nonad / ennead
10	decuple	decad / decade (antiquated)

== Fractions and decimals ==
Numbers used to denote the denominator of a fraction are known linguistically as "partitive numerals". In spoken English, ordinal numerals and partitive numerals are identical with a few exceptions. Thus "fifth" can mean the element between fourth and sixth, or the fraction created by dividing the unit into five pieces. When used as a partitive numeral, these forms can be pluralized: one seventh, two sevenths. The sole exceptions to this rule are division by one, two, and sometimes four: "first" and "second" cannot be used for a fraction with a denominator of one or two. Instead, "whole" and "half" (plural "halves") are used. For a fraction with a denominator of four, either "fourth" or "quarter" may be used.

Here are some common English fractions, or partitive numerals:

${\tfrac{1}{100}}$	one one-hundredth
${\tfrac{2}{100}}$	two one-hundredths
${\tfrac{3}{100}}$	three one-hundredths
${\tfrac{1}{200}}$	one two-hundredth
${\tfrac{2}{200}}$	two two-hundredths
${\tfrac{3}{200}}$	three two-hundredths
${\tfrac{1}{16}}$	one-sixteenth
${\tfrac{1}{10}}$ or 0.1	one-tenth
${\tfrac{1}{8}}$	one-eighth
${\tfrac{2}{10}}$ or 0.2	two-tenths or one-fifth
${\tfrac{1}{4}}$	one-quarter or one-fourth
$\tfrac{3}{10}$ or 0.3	three-tenths
${\tfrac{1}{3}}$	one-third
${\tfrac{3}{8}}$	three-eighths
$\tfrac{4}{10}$ or 0.4	four-tenths or two-fifths
${\tfrac{1}{2}}$	one-half
$\tfrac{6}{10}$ or 0.6	six-tenths or three-fifths
${\tfrac{5}{8}}$	five-eighths
${\tfrac{2}{3}}$	two-thirds
$\tfrac{7}{10}$ or 0.7	seven-tenths
${\tfrac{3}{4}}$	three-quarters or three-fourths
$\tfrac{8}{10}$ or 0.8	eight-tenths or four-fifths
${\tfrac{7}{8}}$	seven-eighths
$\tfrac{9}{10}$ or 0.9	nine-tenths
$\tfrac{15}{16}$	fifteen-sixteenths

Alternatively, and for greater numbers, one may say for 1/2 "one over two", for 5/8 "five over eight", and so on. This "over" form is also widely used in mathematics.

Fractions together with an integer are read as follows:

- 1 1/2 is "one and a half"
- 6 1/4 is "six and a quarter"
- 7 5/8 is "seven and five eighths"

A space is placed to mark the boundary between the whole number and the fraction part unless superscripts and subscripts are used; for example:

- 9 1/2
- 9 1/2
- 9 1/2

Numbers with a decimal point may be read as a cardinal number, then "and", then another cardinal number followed by an indication of the significance of the second cardinal number (mainly U.S.); or as a cardinal number, followed by "point", and then by the digits of the fractional part. The indication of significance takes the form of the denominator of the fraction indicating division by the smallest power of ten larger than the second cardinal. This is modified when the first cardinal is zero, in which case neither the zero nor the "and" is pronounced, but the zero is optional in the "point" form of the fraction.

Some American and Canadian schools teach students to pronounce decimaly written fractions (for example, .5) as though they were longhand fractions (five-tenths), such as thirteen and seven-tenths for 13.7. This formality is often dropped in common speech and is steadily disappearing in instruction in mathematics and science as well as in international American schools. In the U.K., and among most North Americans, 13.7 would be read thirteen point seven.

For example:

- 0.002 is "point zero zero two", "point oh oh two", "nought point zero zero two", etc.; or "two thousandths" (U.S., occasionally)
- 3.1416 is "three point one four one six"
- 99.3 is "ninety-nine point three"; or "ninety-nine and three tenths" (U.S., occasionally).

In English the decimal point was originally printed in the center of the line (0·002), but with the advent of the typewriter it was placed at the bottom of the line, so that a single key could be used as a full stop/period and as a decimal point. In many non-English languages a full-stop/period at the bottom of the line is used as a thousands separator with a comma being used as the decimal point.

== Whether or not digits or words are used ==
With few exceptions, most grammatical texts rule that the numbers zero to nine inclusive should be "written out" – instead of "1" and "2", one would write "one" and "two".

Example: "I have two apples." (Preferred)
Example: "I have 2 apples."

After "nine", one can head straight back into the 10, 11, 12, etc., although some write out the numbers until "twelve".

Example: "I have 28 grapes." (Preferred)
Example: "I have twenty-eight grapes."

Another common usage is to write out any number that can be expressed as one or two words, and use figures otherwise.

Examples:

"There are six million dogs." (Preferred)
"There are 6,000,000 dogs."
"That is one hundred and twenty-five oranges." (British English)
"That is one hundred twenty-five oranges." (US-American English)
"That is 125 oranges." (Preferred)

Numbers at the beginning of a sentence should also be written out, or the sentence rephrased.

The above rules are not always followed. In literature, larger numbers might be spelled out. On the other hand, digits might be more commonly used in technical or financial articles, where many figures are discussed. In particular, the two different forms should not be used for figures that serve the same purpose; for example, it is inelegant to write, "Between day twelve and day 15 of the study, the population doubled."

== Empty numbers ==
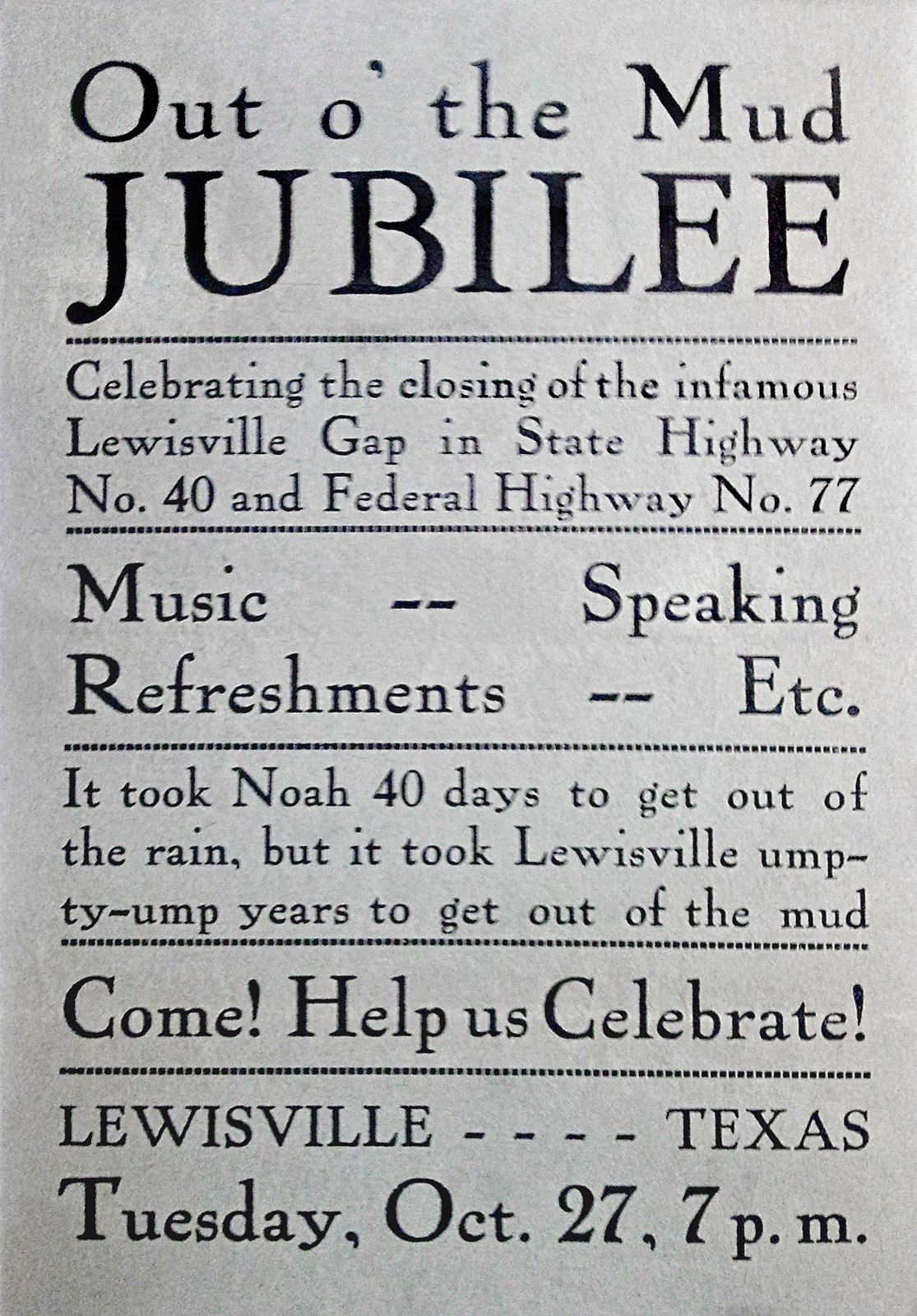
"Out of the Mud" flyer

Colloquial English's small vocabulary of empty or indefinite numbers can be employed when there is uncertainty as to the precise number to use, but it is desirable to define a general range: specifically, the terms "umpteen", "umpty", and "zillion". These are derived etymologically from the range affixes:

- "-teen" (designating the range as being between 13 and 19 inclusive)
- "-ty" (designating the range as being between 20 and 90 inclusive)
- "-illion" (designating the range as being above 1,000,000; or, more generally, as being extremely large).

The prefix "ump-" is added to the first two suffixes to produce the empty numbers "umpteen" and "umpty": derived from the onomatopoeic sound on the telegraph key used by Morse operators. A noticeable absence of an empty number is in the hundreds range.

Usage of empty numbers:

- The word "umpteen" may be used as an adjective, as in "I had to go to umpteen stores to find shoes that fit." It can also be used to modify a larger number, usually "million", as in "Umpteen million people watched the show; but they still cancelled it."
- "Umpty" is not in common usage. It can appear in the form "umpty-one" (paralleling the usage in such numbers as "twenty-one"), as in "There are umpty-one ways to do it wrong." "Umpty-ump" is also heard, though "ump" is never used by itself.
- The word "zillion" may be used as an adjective, modifying a noun. The noun phrase normally contains the indefinite article "a", as in "There must be a zillion pages on the World Wide Web."
- The plural "zillions" designates a number indefinitely larger than "millions" or "billions". In this case, the construction is parallel to the one for "millions" or "billions", with the number used as a plural count noun, followed by a prepositional phrase with "of", as in "There are zillions of grains of sand on the beaches of the world."
- Empty numbers are sometimes made up, with obvious meaning: "squillions" is obviously an empty, but very large, number; a "squintillionth" would be a very small number.
- Some empty numbers may be modified by actual numbers, such as "four zillion", and are used for jest, exaggeration, or to relate abstractly to actual numbers.
- Empty numbers are colloquial, and primarily used in oral speech or informal contexts. They are inappropriate in formal or scholarly usage.

See also Placeholder name.

== See also ==
- Indefinite and fictitious numbers
- List of numbers
- Long and short scales
- Names of large numbers
- Natural number
- Number prefixes and their derivatives
