= 4104 =

← 4103	4104	4105 →
- List of numbers; Integers; ← 0 1k 2k 3k 4k 5k 6k 7k 8k 9k →
- Cardinal: four thousand one hundred four
- Ordinal: 4104th (four thousand one hundred fourth)
- Factorization: 2^{3} × 3^{3} × 19
- Divisors: 1, 2, 3, 4, 6, 8, 9, 12, 18, 19, 24, 27, 36, 38, 54, 57, 72, 76, 108, 114, 152, 171, 216, 228, 342, 456, 513, 684, 1026, 1368, 2052, 4104
- Greek numeral: ,ΔΡΔ´
- Roman numeral: MV̅CIV, or I̅V̅CIV
- Binary: 1000000001000_{2}
- Ternary: 12122000_{3}
- Senary: 31000_{6}
- Octal: 10010_{8}
- Duodecimal: 2460_{12}
- Hexadecimal: 1008_{16}

4104 (four thousand one hundred [and] four) is the natural number following 4103 and preceding 4105.

== In mathematics ==
4104 is a composite number, as it has the prime factorization 2^{3} × 3^{3} × 19.

4104 can be expressed as the sum of two positive cubes in two different ways: 4104 is the sum of 4096 + 8 (that is, 16^{3} + 2^{3}), and also the sum of 3375 + 729 (that is, 15^{3} + 9^{3}). By the former property, it is also the sum of two powers of 8: 8^{4} + 8^{1}.

There are 4104 different Cayley graphs on 26 nodes, and 4104 ways of 4-coloring a map in which there is a central circle surrounded by a ring divided into 10 regions.

== See also ==
- Taxicab number
- 1729
