= Assize of Bread and Ale =

Law in medieval England

- Act of Parliament
- Parliament of England
- Long title: Latin: Assisa Panis et Cervisie
- Citation: Stat. Temp. Incert
- Territorial extent: England and Wales; Ireland

Dates
- Repealed: England and Wales: 28 July 1863; Ireland: 10 August 1872

Other legislation
- Amended by: Making of Bread Act 1757; Bread Act 1836
- Repealed by: England and Wales: Statute Law Revision Act 1863; Ireland: Statute Law (Ireland) Revision Act 1872
- Relates to: Brewers and Coopers Act 1531

Status: Repealed

Text of statute as originally enacted

The Assize of Bread and Ale (Latin: Assisa panis et cervisiae) (Stat. Temp. Incert) was a 13th-century law in high medieval England, which regulated the price, weight and quality of the bread and beer manufactured and sold in towns, villages and hamlets. It was the first law in British history to regulate the production and sale of food. At the local level, this resulted in regulatory licensing systems, with arbitrary recurring fees, and fines and punishments for lawbreakers (see amercement). In rural areas, the statute was enforced by manorial lords, who held tri-weekly court sessions.

The law was amended by the Bread Acts of 1822 and 1836, which stipulated that loaves should be sold by the pound, or multiple thereof, and finally repealed by the Statute Law Revision Act 1863 (26 & 27 Vict. c. 125).

== Background ==
Bread regulation was the most significant and long-lasting commercial law in medieval England. The first bread assize law dates back to the 13th century, but its origins are even older. This law can be traced back to proclamations from the reigns of Henry II and John that regulated the purchasing requirements of the royal household.

These assizes adjusted the weight of bread according to the price of wheat. The price of bread was always the same, even though the price of grain fluctuated. Instead, when the price of grain increased, the weight of bread was reduced accordingly. For every increase in the price of wheat, the weight of a loaf fell. The Assize of Bread and Ale set the price of ale and the weight for a farthing loaf of bread. The act reduced competition and was purportedly given at the request of the bakers of Coventry, embracing several ordinances of Henry III's predecessors.

== Economic context ==
The expensive equipment associated with brewing and baking, particularly the oven, created a commercial market for the goods. This resulted in a perceived need for regulations controlling quality and pricing, and checking weights, to avoid fraudulent activity by food providers.

== Declarations ==
Some versions of the statute include an explanatory third paragraph which begins:

By the Consent of the whole Realm of England, the Measure of our Lord the King was made; that is to say: That an English peny, called a Sterling, round and without any clipping, shall weigh 32 Wheat Corns in the midst of the Ear, and 20 d. do make an Ounce, and 12 Ounces one Pound, and 8 Pound do make a Gallon of Wine, and 8 Gallons of Wine do make a London Bushel, which is the Eighth Part of a Quarter.

=== Bread ===
The assize presented an established scale, then of ancient standing, between the prices of wheat and of bread, providing that when the quarter (~240 L / 6.9 US bushel if the gallon is taken to be the wine gallon) of wheat was sold at twelve pence, the farthing loaf of the best white bread should weigh six pounds sixteen shillings (~2.5 kg / 5.6 lb avdp if the pound is taken to be the troy pound). It then graduated the weight of bread according to the price of wheat, and for every six pence added to the quarter of wheat, the weight of the farthing loaf was reduced; until, when the wheat was at twenty shillings a quarter, it directed the weight of the loaf to be six shillings and three pence (~120 g / 4.1 oz avdp)..

The assize of bread was in force until the beginning of the 19th century, and was only then abolished in London.

=== Ale ===
In a similar manner, the assize regulated the price of the gallon of ale, by the price of wheat, barley, and oats, stating that,

when a quarter of wheat was sold for three shillings, or three shillings and four-pence, and a quarter of barley for twenty pence or twenty-four pence, and a quarter of oats for fifteen pence, brewers in cities could afford to sell two gallons of ale for a penny, and out of cities three gallons for a penny; and when in a town (in burgo) three gallons are sold for a penny, out of a town they may and ought to sell four.

Over time, this uniform scale of price created opportunities for arbitrage that made it extremely inconvenient and oppressive; and by the Brewers and Coopers Act 1531 (23 Hen. 8. c. 4) in the 16th century, it was enacted that ale-brewers should charge for their ale such prices as might appear convenient and sufficient in the discretion of the justices of the peace within whose jurisdiction where the ale-brewers lived. The price of ale was regulated by provisions like those stated above, and the quality was ascertained by officers of great antiquity, called gustatores cervisiae, that is, "aletasters" or ale-conners, chosen annually in the court-leet of each manor, and were sworn "to examine and assay the beer and ale, and to take care that they were good and wholesome, and sold at proper prices according to the assize; and also to present all defaults of brewers to the next court-leet."

== Impact ==
The assize likely led to the term 'baker's dozen', as bakers would include an extra loaf to ensure that they did not violate the law.

In the cities of York and Gloucester, the tradition has been revived in recent years, and is known as the Sheriff's Assize of Ale.

== Subsequent developments ==
The act was extended to Ireland by Poynings' Law 1495 (10 Hen. 7. c. 22 (I)).

The whole act was repealed for England and Wales by section 1 of, and the schedule to, the Statute Law Revision Act 1863 (26 & 27 Vict. c. 125), which came into force on 28 July 1863.

The whole act was repealed for Ireland by section 1 of, and the schedule to, the Statute Law (Ireland) Revision Act 1872 (35 & 36 Vict. c. 98), which came into force on 10 August 1872.

== See also ==
- Other English Weights and Measures Acts
- Vantage loaf
- Worshipful Company of Bakers

== Bibliography ==
- "The Assizes of Bread, Beer, & Lucrum Pistoris". Internet Medieval Sourcebook. Fordham University. 1999. [not accessible at Dec 2023]
- Bennett, Judith M. (2004). Women in the Medieval English Countryside. New York: Oxford University Press. ISBN 978-0195045611.
- Cartwright, Peter (2001). Consumer Protection and the Criminal Law. Cambridge: Cambridge University Press. p. 152. ISBN 0-521-59080-9.
- Davis, James (2004). "Baking for the common good: a reassessment of the assize of bread in Medieval England". The Economic History Review. 57 (3): 464–502. doi:10.1111/j.1468-0289.2004.00285.x. JSTOR 3698543. S2CID 154643188.
- Gibbins, Henry de Beltgens (1897). The Industrial History of England. London: Methuen & Co.
- Hornsey, Ian (2004). A History of Beer and Brewing. London: Royal Society of Chemistry. ISBN 0-85404-630-5.
- Ross, Alan S. C. (1956). "The Assize of Bread". The Economic History Review. 9 (2): 332–342. doi:10.2307/2591750. JSTOR 2591750.
- Wood, Diana (2002). Medieval Economic Thought. Cambridge: Cambridge University Press. ISBN 0-521-45893-5.
