= Generalized taxicab number =

Smallest number expressable as the sum of j numbers to the kth power in n ways

Unsolved problem in mathematics
Does there exist any number that can be expressed as a sum of two positive fifth powers in at least two different ways, i.e., $a^5+b^5=c^5+d^5$?
More unsolved problems in mathematics

In number theory, the generalized taxicab number Taxicab(k, j, n) is the smallest number — if it exists — that can be expressed as the sum of j numbers to the kth positive power in n different ways. For k = 3 and j = 2, they coincide with the taxicab number.

$$\begin{align}
\mathrm{Taxicab}(1, 2, 2) &= 4 = 1 + 3 = 2 + 2 \\
\mathrm{Taxicab}(2, 2, 2) &= 50 = 1^2 + 7^2 = 5^2 + 5^2 \\
\mathrm{Taxicab}(3, 2, 2) &= 1729 = 1^3 + 12^3 = 9^3 + 10^3
\end{align}$$

The latter example is 1729, as first noted by Ramanujan.

Euler showed that

$$\mathrm{Taxicab}(4, 2, 2) = 635318657 = 59^4 + 158^4 = 133^4 + 134^4.$$

However, Taxicab(5, 2, n) is not known for any n ≥ 2:
No positive integer is known that can be written as the sum of two 5th powers in more than one way, and it is not known whether such a number exists.

== See also ==
- Cabtaxi number
- Lander, Parkin, and Selfridge conjecture
