= Jean Pépin =

Jean Pépin may refer to:

- Jean François Théophile Pépin (1826 – 1904), known as Théophile Pépin, French mathematician
- Jean Pépin (philosopher) (1924 – 2005), French philosopher
- Jean-Luc Pépin (1924-1995), Canadian politician and academic
