= Vantage loaf =

Thirteenth loaf of a baker's dozen

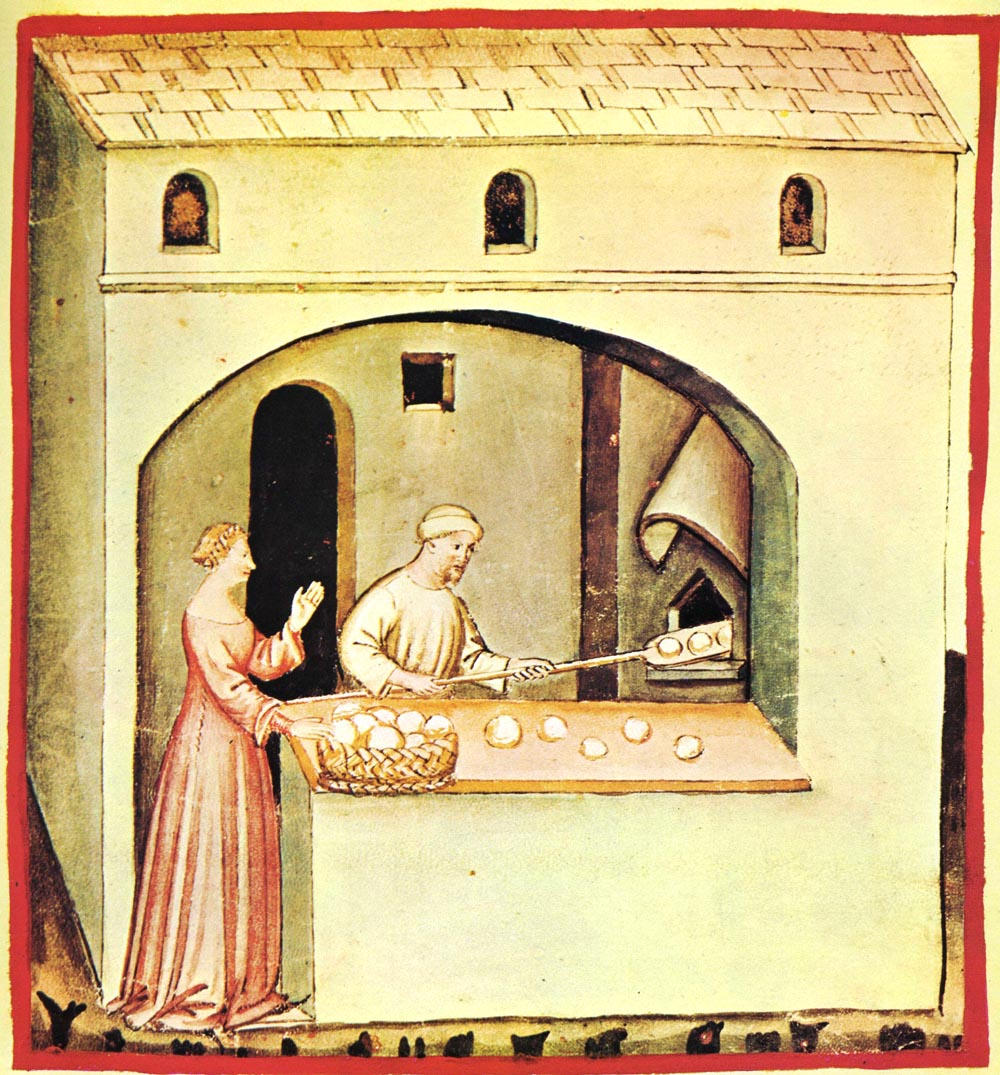
In medieval England the vantage loaf was added free to each dozen sold. For smaller orders a small extra piece of bread was thrown in, known as the "in-bread".

A vantage loaf or vantage of bread is the thirteenth loaf of a baker's dozen, a loaf of bread which is to the buyer's advantage, being in addition to the number ordered.

The 13th-century English law governing trade in bread and ale, known as the Assize of Bread and Ale, imposed severe punishment for short measure. This could be a fine, destruction of the baker's oven, or even the pillory. To protect themselves, bakers would add a small piece of bread to each order, called the "in-bread", to ensure they could not be accused of short measure. For large orders of 12 loaves, this would be a whole extra loaf.

In years of good harvest, a baker could be making more bread than could be sold from the shop. Extra bread was then sold on to middlemen or "hucksters", who would resell it in the streets. Since the price of bread was fixed by law (again by the Assize of Bread and Ale), this was advantageous for both parties: the baker would manage to sell the surplus bread to the huckster, and the huckster would in turn make a profit by selling the vantage loaf, the 13th loaf gotten free.

== Origin ==
The term appears in Randle Cotgrave's A Dictionarie of the French and English Tongues (1611), translated from the old French "trezain":

Trezain: m. A thirteenth; whence;
Le trezain du pain. Vantage of bread; the thirteenth loafe given by Bakers unto the dozen.

— Randle Cotgrave, A Dictionarie of the French and English Tongues (1611), page 928
