= Bernard Frénicle de Bessy =

French mathematician (d. 1674)

Bernard Frénicle de Bessy (c. 1604 – 1674), was a French mathematician born in Paris, who wrote numerous mathematical papers, mainly in number theory and combinatorics. He is best remembered for Des quarrez ou tables magiques, a treatise on magic squares published posthumously in 1693, in which he described all 880 essentially different normal magic squares of order 4. The Frénicle standard form, a standard representation of magic squares, is named after him. He solved many problems created by Fermat and also discovered the cube property of the number 1729 (Ramanujan number), later referred to as a taxicab number. He is also remembered for his treatise Traité des triangles rectangles en nombres published (posthumously) in 1676 and reprinted in 1729.

Bessy was a member of many of the scientific circles of his day, including the French Academy of Sciences, and corresponded with many prominent mathematicians, such as Mersenne and Pascal. Bessy was also particularly close to Fermat, Descartes and Wallis, and was best known for his insights into number theory.

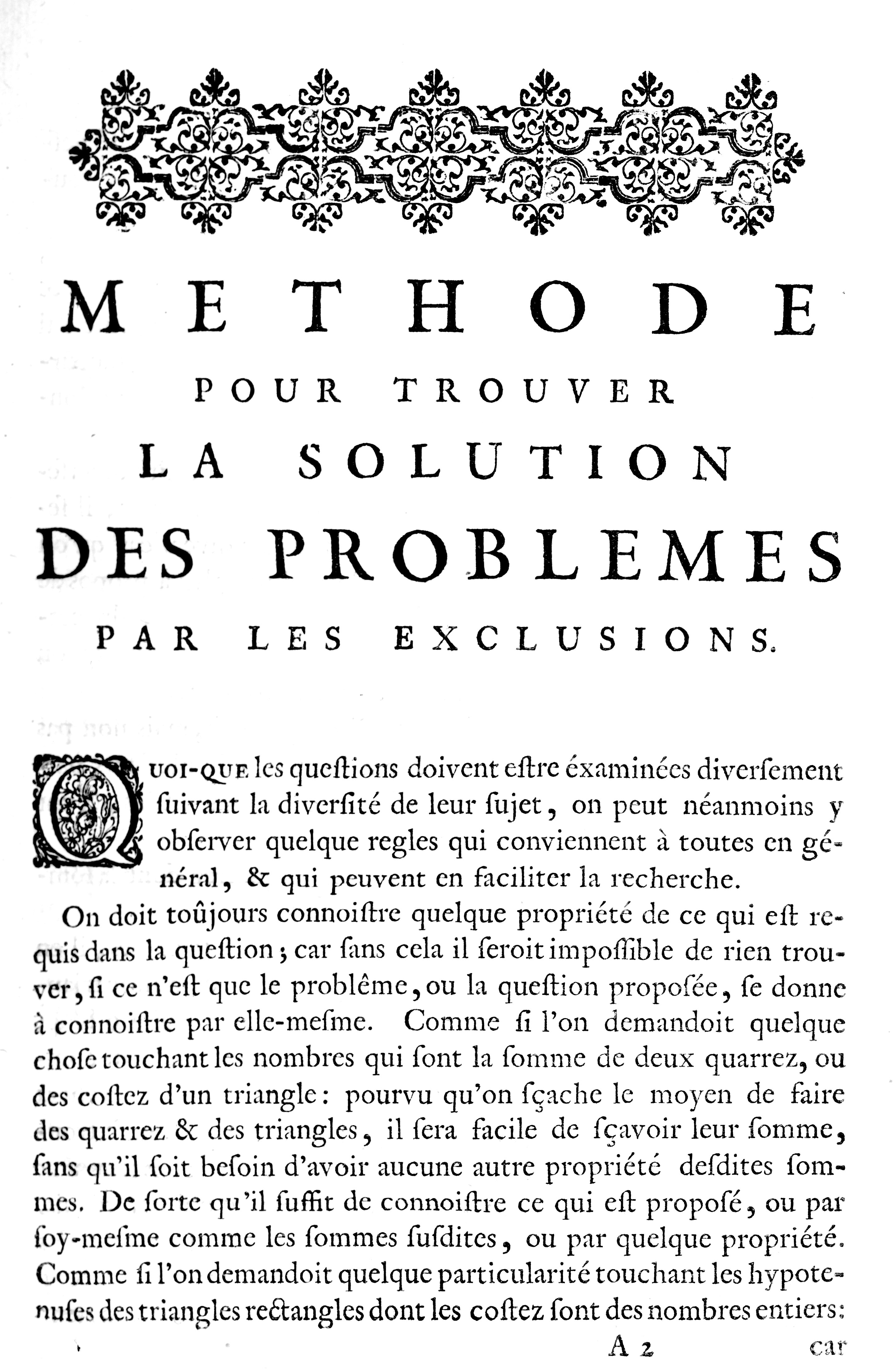
Frenicle's Methode, 1754 edition.

In 1661 he proposed to John Wallis a problem of what amounted to the following system of equations in integers,

x^{2} + y^{2} = z^{2}, x^{2} = u^{2} + v^{2}, x − y = u − v > 0.

A solution was given by Théophile Pépin in 1880.

== La Méthode des exclusions ==
Frénicle's La Méthode des exclusions was published (posthumously) in 1693, which appeared in the fifth volume of Mémoires de l'académie royale des sciences depuis 1666 jusq'à (1729, Paris), though the work appears to have been written around 1640. The book contains a short introduction followed by ten rules, intended to serve as a "method" or general rules one should apply in order to solve mathematical problems. During the Renaissance, "method" was primarily used for educational purposes, rather than for professional mathematicians (or natural philosophers). However, Frénicle's rules imply slight methodological preferences which suggests a turn towards explorational purposes.

Frénicle's text provided a number of examples on how his rules ought to be applied. He proposed the problem of determining whether or not a given integer can be the hypotenuse of a right-angled triangle (it is not clear if Frénicle initially intended the other two sides of the triangle to have integral length). He considers the case where the integer is 221 and promptly applies his second rule, which states that "if you do not know, even generally, what is proposed, find its properties by systematically constructing similar numbers." He then goes on and exploits the Pythagorean theorem. Next, the third rule is applied, which states that "in order not to omit any necessary number, establish the order of investigation as simple as possible." Frénicle then takes increasing sums of perfect squares. He produces tables of computations and is able to reduce computations by rules four to six, which all deal with simplifying matters. He eventually arrives at the conclusion that it is possible for 221 to satisfy the property under certain conditions and checks his assertion by experimentation.

== Experimental approach ==
The example in La Méthode des exclusions represents an experimental approach to mathematics. This is in contrast with the standard Euclidean approach of the time, which emphasized axioms and deductive reasoning. Frénicle instead relied on structured and careful observations to find interesting patterns and constructions rather than producing proofs in the axiomatic Euclidean sense. He himself even said that "this research is mainly useful for possible questions, using for most of them no proof other than construction."
