= Taxicab number =

Class of integer

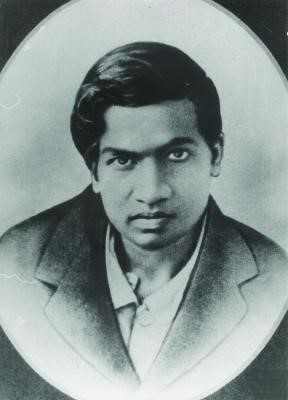
Srinivasa Ramanujan (picture) was bedridden when he developed the idea of taxicab numbers, according to an anecdote from G. H. Hardy.

In mathematics, the nth taxicab number, typically denoted Ta(n) or Taxicab(n), is defined as the smallest integer that can be expressed as a sum of two positive integer cubes in n distinct ways. The most famous taxicab number is 1729 = Ta(2) = 1^{3} + 12^{3} = 9^{3} + 10^{3}, also known as the Hardy–Ramanujan number.

The name is derived from a conversation ca. 1919 involving mathematicians G. H. Hardy and Srinivasa Ramanujan. As told by Hardy:

I remember once going to see him [Ramanujan] when he was lying ill at Putney. I had ridden in taxi-cab No. 1729, and remarked that the number seemed to be rather a dull one, and that I hoped it was not an unfavourable omen. "No," he replied, "it is a very interesting number; it is the smallest number expressible as the sum of two cubes in two different ways."

== History and definition ==
The pairs of summands of the Hardy–Ramanujan number Ta(2) = 1729 were first mentioned by Bernard Frénicle de Bessy, who published his observation in 1657. 1729 was made famous as the first taxicab number in the early 20th century by a story involving Srinivasa Ramanujan in claiming it to be the smallest for his particular example of two summands. In 1938, G. H. Hardy and E. M. Wright proved that such numbers exist for all positive integers n, and their proof is easily converted into a computer program to generate such numbers. However, the proof makes no claims about whether the thus-generated numbers are the smallest possible and so it does not directly provide the actual value of Ta(n).

The taxicab numbers subsequent to 1729 were found with the help of computers. John Leech obtained Ta(3) in 1957. E. Rosenstiel, J. A. Dardis and C. R. Rosenstiel found Ta(4) in 1989. J. A. Dardis found Ta(5) in 1994 and it was confirmed by David W. Wilson in 1999. Ta(6) was announced by Uwe Hollerbach on the NMBRTHRY mailing list on March 9, 2008, following a 2003 paper by Calude et al. that gave a 99% probability that the number was actually Ta(6). Upper bounds for Ta(7) to Ta(12) were found by Christian Boyer in 2006.

The restriction of the summands to positive numbers is necessary, because allowing negative numbers allows for more (and smaller) instances of numbers that can be expressed as sums of cubes in n distinct ways. (sequence A293647 in the OEIS). The concept of a cabtaxi number has been introduced to allow for alternative, less restrictive definitions of this nature. In a sense, the specification of two summands and powers of three is also restrictive; a generalized taxicab number allows for these values to be other than two and three, respectively.

== Known taxicab numbers ==
So far, the following 6 taxicab numbers are known:

$$\begin{align}
\operatorname{Ta}(1) &= \ 2 \\
&= 1^3 + 1^3 \\
\operatorname{Ta}(2) &= \ 1729 \\
&= 1^3 + 12^3 \\
&= 9^3 + 10^3 \\
\operatorname{Ta}(3) &= \ 87539319 = 3^3\times 3242197\\
&= 167^3 + 436^3 \\
&= 228^3 + 423^3 \\
&= 255^3 + 414^3 \\
\operatorname{Ta}(4) &= \ 6963472309248 = 24^3\times 503723402\\
&= 2421^3 + 19083^3 \\
&= 5436^3 + 18948^3 \\
&= 10200^3 + 18072^3 \\
&= 13322^3 + 16630^3 \\
\operatorname{Ta}(5) &= \ 48988659276962496 = 84^3\times 82652823799\\
&= 38787^3 + 365757^3 \\
&= 107839^3 + 362753^3 \\
&= 205292^3 + 342952^3 \\
&= 221424^3 + 336588^3 \\
&= 231518^3 + 331954^3 \\
\operatorname{Ta}(6) &= \ 24153319581254312065344 = 79^3\times 84^3\times 82652823799\\
&= 582162^3 + 28906206^3 \\
&= 3064173^3 + 28894803^3 \\
&= 8519281^3 + 28657487^3 \\
&= 16218068^3 + 27093208^3 \\
&= 17492496^3 + 26590452^3 \\
&= 18289922^3 + 26224366^3
\end{align}$$

== Upper bounds for taxicab numbers ==
For the following taxicab numbers upper bounds are known. Define $\operatorname{Ta}(6)=79^3\times84^3\times82652823799$ as above, then,

$$\begin{align}
\operatorname{Ta}(7) &\le 24885189317885898975235988544 =101^3\times\operatorname{Ta}(6)\\
&= 58798362^3 + 2919526806^3 \\
&= 309481473^3 + 2918375103^3 \\
&= 459531128^3 + 2915734948^3 \\
&= 860447381^3 + 2894406187^3 \\
&= 1638024868^3 + 2736414008^3 \\
&= 1766742096^3 + 2685635652^3 \\
&= 1847282122^3 + 2648660966^3 \\
\operatorname{Ta}(8) &\le 50974398750539071400590819921724352 =101^3\times 127^3\times\operatorname{Ta}(6)\\
&= 7467391974^3 + 370779904362^3 \\
&= 39304147071^3 + 370633638081^3 \\
&= 58360453256^3 + 370298338396^3 \\
&= 109276817387^3 + 367589585749^3 \\
&= 208029158236^3 + 347524579016^3 \\
&= 224376246192^3 + 341075727804^3 \\
&= 234604829494^3 + 336379942682^3 \\
&= 288873662876^3 + 299512063576^3 \\
\operatorname{Ta}(9) &\le 136897813798023990395783317207361432493888 = 101^3\times 17653^3\times\operatorname{Ta}(6)\\
&= 1037967484386^3 + 51538406706318^3 \\
&= 4076877805588^3 + 51530042142656^3 \\
&= 5463276442869^3 + 51518075693259^3 \\
&= 8112103002584^3 + 51471469037044^3 \\
&= 15189477616793^3 + 51094952419111^3 \\
&= 28916052994804^3 + 48305916483224^3 \\
&= 31188298220688^3 + 47409526164756^3 \\
&= 32610071299666^3 + 46756812032798^3 \\
&= 40153439139764^3 + 41632176837064^3 \\
\operatorname{Ta}(10) &\le 7335345315241855602572782233444632535674275447104 = 101^3\times 6655181^3\times\operatorname{Ta}(6)\\
&= 391313741613522^3 + 19429979328281886^3 \\
&= 904069333568884^3 + 19429379778270560^3 \\
&= 1536982932706676^3 + 19426825887781312^3 \\
&= 2059655218961613^3 + 19422314536358643^3 \\
&= 3058262831974168^3 + 19404743826965588^3 \\
&= 5726433061530961^3 + 19262797062004847^3 \\
&= 10901351979041108^3 + 18211330514175448^3 \\
&= 11757988429199376^3 + 17873391364113012^3 \\
&= 12293996879974082^3 + 17627318136364846^3 \\
&= 15137846555691028^3 + 15695330667573128^3 \\
\operatorname{Ta}(11) &\le 87039729655193781808322993393446581825405320183232000 \\
&= 5134510178400057^3 + 443171971973855943^3 \\
&= 27089483598685872^3 + 443138459854855128^3 \\
&= 127174000598779680^3 + 439653507772479000^3 \\
&= 138573856797762960^3 + 438609133406051160^3 \\
&= 204623083640747772^3 + 428126038425768228^3 \\
&= 209891877907138700^3 + 426887616463852180^3 \\
&= 212424209933109720^3 + 426267111265435440^3 \\
&= 299032406381730840^3 + 392138457234189120^3 \\
&= 301539992238035460^3 + 390662458762053660^3 \\
&= 309479752750029680^3 + 385744811881975000^3 \\
&= 316469686016945240^3 + 381087194739069520^3 \\
\operatorname{Ta}(12) &\le 16119148654034302034428760115512552827992287460693283776000 \\
&= 292667080168803249^3 + 25260802402509788751^3 \\
&= 771180546485662040^3 + 25260575914339118080^3 \\
&= 1544100565125094704^3 + 25258892211726742296^3 \\
&= 7248918034130441760^3 + 25060249943031303000^3 \\
&= 7898709837472488720^3 + 25000720604144916120^3 \\
&= 11663515767522623004^3 + 24403184190268788996^3 \\
&= 11963837040706905900^3 + 24332594138439574260^3 \\
&= 12108179966187254040^3 + 24297225342129820080^3 \\
&= 17044847163758657880^3 + 22351892062348779840^3 \\
&= 17187779557568021220^3 + 22267760149437058620^3 \\
&= 17640345906751691760^3 + 21987454277272575000^3 \\
&= 18038772102965878680^3 + 21721970100126962640^3
\end{align}$$

== Cubefree taxicab numbers ==
A more restrictive taxicab problem requires that the taxicab number be cubefree, which means that it is not divisible by any cube other than 1^{3}. When a cubefree taxicab number T is written as T = x^{3} + y^{3}, the numbers x and y must be relatively prime. Among the taxicab numbers Ta(n) listed above, only Ta(1) and Ta(2) are cubefree taxicab numbers. The smallest cubefree taxicab number with three representations was discovered by Paul Vojta (unpublished) in 1981 while he was a graduate student:

$$\begin{align}
15170835645 &= 517^3 + 2468^3 \\
&= 709^3 + 2456^3 \\
&= 1733^3 + 2152^3
\end{align}$$

The smallest cubefree taxicab number with four representations was discovered by Stuart Gascoigne and independently by Duncan Moore in 2003:

$$\begin{align}
1801049058342701083 &= 92227^3 + 1216500^3 \\
&= 136635^3 + 1216102^3 \\
&= 341995^3 + 1207602^3 \\
&= 600259^3 + 1165884^3
\end{align}$$
(sequence A080642 in the OEIS).

== Other taxicab numbers ==
The mathematician Neil Sloane defined a slightly different type of taxicab numbers, which are numbers that are the sum of two cubes in two or more ways.

The first few numbers are:

1729, 4104, 13832, 20683, 32832, 39312, 40033, 46683, 64232, 65728, 110656, 110808, 134379, 149389, 165464, 171288 ... (sequence A001235 in the OEIS)

== See also ==
- 1729 (number) – Natural number
- Diophantine equation – Polynomial equation whose integer solutions are sought
- Euler's sum of powers conjecture – Disproved conjecture in number theory
- Generalized taxicab number – Smallest number expressable as the sum of j numbers to the kth power in n ways
- Beal's conjecture – Conjecture in number theory
- Jacobi–Madden equation – Quartic diophantine equation in 4 variables
- Prouhet–Tarry–Escott problem – Unsolved problem about sums of powers
- Pythagorean quadruple – Four integers where the sum of the squares of three equals the square of the fourth
- Sums of three cubes – Problem in number theory
- Sums of powers – List of mathematical contexts in which exponentiated terms are summed, a list of related conjectures and theorems
- Interesting number paradox – On the smallest non-interesting number
- Cabtaxi number – Smallest positive integer written as the sum of two integer cubes in n ways
