= Ale conner =

Officer ensuring bread and beer quality

An ale conner (sometimes aleconner or ale-kenner) was an officer appointed yearly at the court-leet of ancient English communities to ensure the quality of bread, ale, and beer, as well as regulating the measures in which they were sold and their prices. There were many different names for this position which varied from place to place: "ale-tasters", gustatores cervisiae, "ale-founders", and "ale-conners". Ale-conners were also often trusted to ensure that the beer was sold at a fair price.

Four ale-conners are still chosen annually by the Common-Hall of the City of London.

== History ==
=== The assize of bread and ale ===
The office has its statutory origin in the regulation of the medieval assize of bread and ale, a 13th-century law usually attributed to the statute 51 Hen. III (the 51st year of the reign of Henry III), of about 1266–1267, which fixed the price, weight and quality of bread and ale sold in towns and villages. The quality of ale was assessed by officers known by various names, including gustatores cervisiae, ale-tasters and ale-conners, who were chosen annually in the court-leet of each manor and sworn to examine and assay the ale, to ensure it was wholesome and sold at the assize price, and to report defaulting brewers to the next court. In rural areas the assize was enforced by manorial lords through regular court sessions.

The uniform pricing scale of the assize became unworkable over time, and the Brewers and Coopers Act 1531 (23 Hen. 8. c. 4) provided instead that ale-brewers should charge prices fixed at the discretion of the local justices of the peace. The assize was eventually repealed for England and Wales by the Statute Law Revision Act 1863.

=== City of London ===
Four ale-conners have long been chosen annually by Common Hall of the City of London, on Midsummer Day, alongside the election of the sheriffs. The office was already regarded as a sinecure by the mid-18th century: the Oxford English Dictionary records that in 1755 Samuel Johnson described the places as having formerly had a use but by then being regarded only as sinecures for decayed citizens, with a salary of £10 per annum attached.

From the 12th century the Lord Mayor set the assize of ale within the City by proclamation, fixing both quality and price; recorded prices for the best ale rose over the following centuries as the price of malt fluctuated.

The early ale-conners were ward officers. Regulations made in the reign of Edward I, around 1300, required brewers to send for the ale-conners of the ward in which they lived to taste each new brew before it was sold, and the conners were elected in each ward with the assent of the alderman and reputable ward men. A list of 1377 shows that most wards elected four, amounting to nearly a hundred sworn ale-conners across the City.

From the early 15th century the picture became confused as appointment drifted away from the wards. Although a Common Council precept of 1440 directed that the "Testers of Ale, called Aleconners" should continue to be elected in wardmote as before, four ale-conners were by 1429 and 1432 being sworn among the masters of the City misteries, which may indicate appointment by the trade rather than the ward. A petition of the Company of Brewers in 1482 indicates that the tasting and survey of ale had by then largely become the province of that company, in the manner of other City companies regulating their own products.

Matters were complicated further by the emergence of beer-brewing, using hops, as distinct from the older ale-brewing. The two crafts were regulated separately for a time, with searchers of beer appointed from the 1440s. In 1551 an Act of Common Council named the first Surveyors of the Beerbrewers, among them the chronicler and printer Richard Grafton; the antiquary John Stow served as an ale-conner on five occasions between 1584 and 1595. According to Truscott, a comprehensive Act of Common Council of 1564 was instrumental in breaking down the distinction between ale-conners and surveyors of beer, giving the surveyors authority over both ale-brewers and beer-brewers. Officers appointed centrally in this way were known as Surveyors of Ale and Beer, a title still rendered in the official minutes of Common Hall as "Surveyors of Ale and Beer commonly called Aleconners".

From the late 18th century the office declined as its fees dwindled, with petitions of 1785, 1796 and 1802 complaining of reduced income; in 1803 the Common Council settled an annual sum of £10 on each ale-conner and provided their gowns. In 1835 the Common Council resolved that the office had "ceased to be of any public utility", though the four ale-conners continued to be elected.

== The leather breeches myth ==
A widely repeated story holds that medieval ale-conners wore leather breeches and tested ale by pouring a sample onto a wooden bench, sitting in it for around half an hour, and judging the ale by whether their breeches stuck to the seat. The account is often presented as fact but has no known basis in contemporary medieval evidence.

The earliest traceable appearance of the tale is in Frederick W. Hackwood's Inns, Ales and Drinking Customs of Old England (1911), which attributes it to an unnamed authority; it does not appear in the major nineteenth-century works on brewing. Later retellings disagree on what a sticky bench was meant to indicate: Hackwood took stickiness as a sign of excess sugar and therefore impurity, whereas H. S. Corran's A History of Brewing (1975) records the opposite, that a bench which stuck signified ale of the right quality. Variants of the same story appear in German, Flemish, Alsatian and Czech tradition.

The surviving oaths sworn by medieval ale-conners required them to taste ale offered for sale and to report defaults, but made no reference to sitting in it. A statute associated with the reign of William I of Scotland (reigned 1165–1214) directed that ale-tasters should not drink to excess while testing, lest they lose their judgement, and that they should stand in the street rather than enter the alehouse, sending a member of their company in with a serjeant to select the pot to be tasted.

A later form of the story transfers the practice to the excise official, or "gauger", after the introduction of beer duty in 1643, claiming it was used to distinguish strong beer from small. Regulations digested in 1707 record the gauger's right to taste beer on a brewer's dray or in a cellar, but make no mention of any such test.

== Modern-day ==
=== City of London ===
Four ale-conners continue to be elected each year at Common Hall in the City of London, held at Guildhall on or about Midsummer Day, when the liverymen of the City companies also elect the sheriffs, the bridge masters and an auditor. The nominations for ale-conner are read to the Livery by the Common Serjeant, and the election is conducted by the Deputy Town Clerk if contested. The office carries no remaining practical duties and the title is regarded as a sinecure.

In 2007 Dr Christine Rigden, a past Sheriff of the City of London, became one of the four ale-conners, reported as the first woman to hold the office in the City.

Serving Ale Conners in the City of London
Office Holder	Livery Company	First Elected
Jonathan Martin Averns	Worshipful Company of Fletchers	2018
Lucy Beacon	Worshipful Company of Musicians	2023
Liam Peter John Randall	Worshipful Company of Coopers	2026
Gary John Smith	Worshipful Company of Furniture Makers	2026

=== Guildable Manor of Southwark ===
Ale conners are also appointed by the Guildable Manor of Southwark, whose court-leet survives as a ceremonial body with no enforcement function. The manor's officers, filled by jurors in rotation, include an Upper Ale Conner and an Under Ale Conner.

=== Revived ceremonies ===
In some English cities the office has been revived as part of a charity event known as the Sheriff's Assize of Ale, in which an ale-conner publicly performs the leather-breeches test, notwithstanding the doubtful historical basis of that ritual. At Gloucester the custom was reintroduced in 2003 by Paul James during his year as Sheriff, and has been held in most years since; the sheriff and a party in medieval costume tour the city's public houses to raise money for civic charities, and the ale-conner sits for three minutes on a stool wetted with ale, the ale passing if the breeches do not stick.
