= Cabtaxi number =

Smallest positive integer written as the sum of two integer cubes in n ways

In number theory, the n-th cabtaxi number, typically denoted Cabtaxi(n), is defined as the smallest positive integer that can be written as the sum of two positive or negative or 0 cubes in n ways. Such numbers exist for all n, which follows from the analogous result for taxicab numbers.

== Known cabtaxi numbers ==
Only 10 cabtaxi numbers are known (sequence A047696 in the OEIS):

$$\begin{align}
\mathrm{Cabtaxi}(1) =& \ 1 \\
&= 1^3 + 0^3 \\[6pt]
\mathrm{Cabtaxi}(2) =& \ 91 \\
&= 3^3 + 4^3 \\
&= 6^3 - 5^3 \\[6pt]
\mathrm{Cabtaxi}(3) =& \ 728 \\
&= 6^3 + 8^3 \\
&= 9^3 - 1^3 \\
&= 12^3 - 10^3 \\[6pt]
\mathrm{Cabtaxi}(4) =& \ 2741256 \\
&= 108^3 + 114^3 \\
&= 140^3 - 14^3 \\
&= 168^3 - 126^3 \\
&= 207^3 - 183^3 \\[6pt]
\mathrm{Cabtaxi}(5) =& \ 6017193 \\
&= 166^3 + 113^3 \\
&= 180^3 + 57^3 \\
&= 185^3 - 68^3 \\
&= 209^3 - 146^3 \\
&= 246^3 - 207^3 \\[6pt]
\mathrm{Cabtaxi}(6) =& \ 1412774811 \\
&= 963^3 + 804^3 \\
&= 1134^3 - 357^3 \\
&= 1155^3 - 504^3 \\
&= 1246^3 - 805^3 \\
&= 2115^3 - 2004^3 \\
&= 4746^3 - 4725^3 \\[6pt]
\mathrm{Cabtaxi}(7) =& \ 11302198488 \\
&= 1926^3 + 1608^3 \\
&= 1939^3 + 1589^3 \\
&= 2268^3 - 714^3 \\
&= 2310^3 - 1008^3 \\
&= 2492^3 - 1610^3 \\
&= 4230^3 - 4008^3 \\
&= 9492^3 - 9450^3 \\[6pt]
\mathrm{Cabtaxi}(8) =& \ 137513849003496 \\
&= 22944^3 + 50058^3 \\
&= 36547^3 + 44597^3 \\
&= 36984^3 + 44298^3 \\
&= 52164^3 - 16422^3 \\
&= 53130^3 - 23184^3 \\
&= 57316^3 - 37030^3 \\
&= 97290^3 - 92184^3 \\
&= 218316^3 - 217350^3 \\[6pt]
\mathrm{Cabtaxi}(9) =& \ 424910390480793000 \\
&= 645210^3 +  538680^3 \\
&= 649565^3 +  532315^3 \\
&= 752409^3 -  101409^3 \\
&= 759780^3 -  239190^3 \\
&= 773850^3 -  337680^3 \\
&= 834820^3 -  539350^3 \\
&= 1417050^3 - 1342680^3 \\
&= 3179820^3 - 3165750^3 \\
&= 5960010^3 - 5956020^3 \\[6pt]
\mathrm{Cabtaxi}(10) =& \ 933528127886302221000 \\
&= 8387730^3 + 7002840^3 \\
&= 8444345^3 + 6920095^3 \\
&= 9773330^3 - 84560^3 \\
&= 9781317^3 - 1318317^3 \\
&= 9877140^3 - 3109470^3 \\
&= 10060050^3 - 4389840^3 \\
&= 10852660^3 - 7011550^3 \\
&= 18421650^3 - 17454840^3 \\
&= 41337660^3 - 41154750^3 \\
&= 77480130^3 - 77428260^3
\end{align}$$

== History ==
The term "Cabtaxi" comes from the taxicab numbers, which is the smallest number representable in n distinct unordered ways as a sum of two positive cubes.

Cabtaxi(2) was known to François Viète and Pietro Bongo in the late 16th century in the equivalent form $3^3+4^3+5^3=6^3$. The existence of Cabtaxi(3) was known to Leonhard Euler, but its actual solution was not found until later, by Edward B. Escott in 1902.

Cabtaxi(4) through Cabtaxi(7) were found by Randall L. Rathbun in 1992; Cabtaxi(8) was found by Daniel J. Bernstein in 1998. Cabtaxi(9) was found by Duncan Moore in 2005, using Bernstein's method. Cabtaxi(10) was first reported as an upper bound by Christian Boyer in 2006 and verified as Cabtaxi(10) by Uwe Hollerbach and reported on the NMBRTHRY mailing list on May 16, 2008.

== See also ==
- Taxicab number
- Generalized taxicab number
