= Dozen =

Group of twelve items

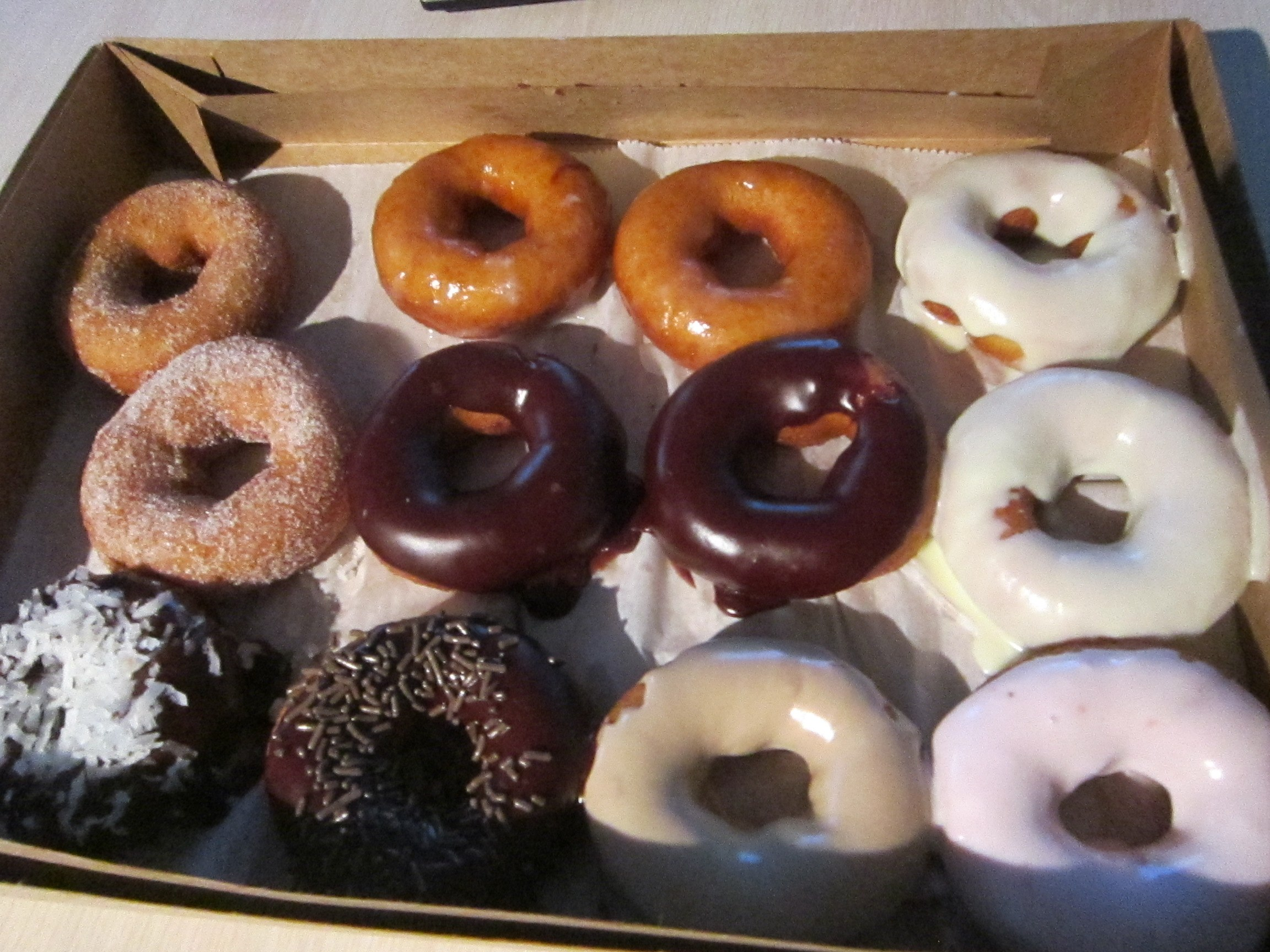
A box of a dozen doughnuts

A dozen (commonly abbreviated doz or dz) is a grouping of twelve. The dozen may be one of the earliest primitive integer groupings, perhaps because there are approximately a dozen cycles of the Moon, or months, in a cycle of the Sun, or year. Twelve is convenient because it has a maximal number of divisors among the numbers up to its double, a property only true of 1, 2, 6, 12, 60, 360, and 2520.

The use of twelve as a base number, known as the duodecimal system (also as dozenal), originated in Mesopotamia (see also sexagesimal). Twelve dozen (12^{2} = 144) are known as a gross; and twelve gross (12^{3} = 1,728, the duodecimal 1,000) are called a great gross, a term most often used when shipping or buying items in bulk. A great hundred, also known as a small gross, is 120 or ten dozen. Dozen may also be used to express a moderately large quantity as in "several dozen" (e.g., dozens of people came to the party).

Varying by country, some products are packaged or sold by the dozen, often foodstuff (a dozen eggs).

== Etymology ==
The English word dozen comes from the old form douzaine, a French word meaning 'a group of twelve' ("Assemblage de choses de même nature au nombre de douze" (translation: A group of twelve things of the same nature), as defined in the eighth edition of the Dictionnaire de l'Académie française). This French word is a derivation from the cardinal numeral douze ('twelve', from Latin duodĕcim) and the collective suffix -aine (from Latin -ēna), a suffix also used to form other words with similar meanings such as quinzaine (a group of fifteen), vingtaine (a group of twenty), centaine (a group of one hundred), etc. These French words have synonymous cognates in Spanish: docena, quincena, veintena, centena, etc. English dozen, French douzaine, Catalan dotzena, Portuguese "dúzia", Persian dowjin "دوجین", Arabic درزن (durzen), Turkish "düzine", Hindi darjan "दर्जन", German Dutzend, Swedish dussin, Dutch dozijn, Italian dozzina and Polish tuzin, are also used as indefinite quantifiers to mean 'about twelve' or 'many' (as in "a dozen times", "dozens of people").

A confusion may arise with the Anglo-Norman dizeyne (French dixaine or dizaine) a tithing, or group of ten households — dating from the earlier English system of grouping households into tens and hundreds for the purposes of law, order and mutual surety (see Tithing). In some texts this 'dizeyne' may be rendered as 'dozen'.

== Half a dozen ==
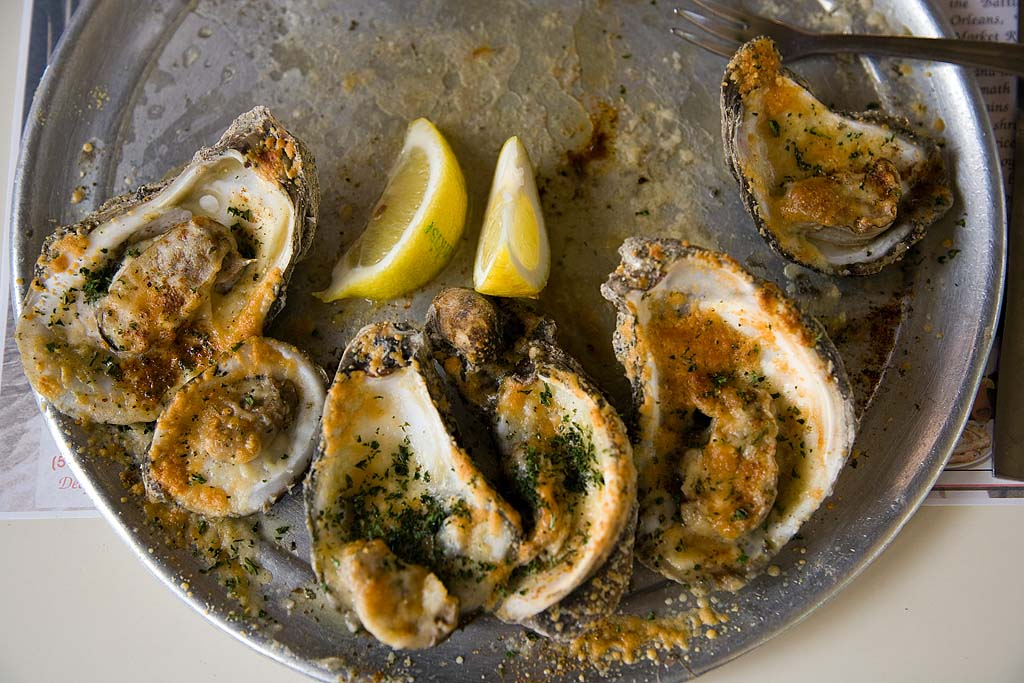
Half a dozen chargrilled oysters

The phrase "half a dozen", also half-dozen or half dozen, means six (6) of something, as 6 is half of 12. The idiom "six of one, half a dozen of the other" means two options are of equal worth so choosing one is the same as choosing the other.

== Baker's dozen ==
A baker's dozen, devil's dozen, or long dozen is 13, one more than a standard dozen. The broadest use of baker's dozen is simply a group of thirteen objects, though it can also refer to fourteen.

The Oxford Dictionary of English derives the expression from the former practice of bakers giving a retailer a thirteenth loaf with a dozen, the additional loaf representing the retailer's profit. This practice is documented in medieval bread regulations. The Liber Albus, compiled in the early 15th century, records an "ancient manner" under which bakers gave female bread retailers thirteen articles of bread for twelve. Historian Sharon Wells describes the provision as legislation defining the profit margins of bread hucksters, who bought bread from bakers and resold it to consumers. The thirteenth piece of bread is known as the vantage loaf.

Another commonly cited explanation connects the custom with medieval penalties for selling deficient bread. Under the Assize of Bread and Ale, a prescribed weight applied to individual loaves, with the required weight varying according to the type of bread and the price of grain. Surviving enforcement records describe individual sample loaves being weighed and found deficient. Records from Leicester likewise describe an arrangement under which thirteen pennyworth of bread was supplied for twelve pence while requiring every loaf to be of full prescribed weight. The alternative explanation holds that bakers nevertheless added the thirteenth loaf as a safeguard against penalties for short weight. It is unclear, however, how an additional loaf would have protected a baker from penalties imposed for individual loaves that failed to meet the prescribed weight.

The expression is recorded from the late 16th century. The 1811 Classical Dictionary of the Vulgar Tongue by Francis Grose defines a baker's dozen as fourteen, explaining that fourteen rolls were allowed to the purchaser of a dozen.

A lesser-used regionalism is the Texas dozen, which generally consists of 15. This is typically used only in Texas and surrounding areas for such goods as flowers or baked goods, although it can be applied to anything that is counted.

== See also ==
- Lagniappe
- Fourteener (poetry)
