= 1729 (number) =

Natural number

← 1728	1729	1730 →
- List of numbers; Integers; ← 0 1k 2k 3k 4k 5k 6k 7k 8k 9k →
- Cardinal: one thousand seven hundred twenty-nine
- Ordinal: 1729th (one thousand seven hundred twenty-ninth)
- Factorization: 7 × 13 × 19
- Divisors: 1, 7, 13, 19, 91, 133, 247, 1729
- Greek numeral: ,ΑΨΚΘ´
- Roman numeral: MDCCXXIX, mdccxxix
- Binary: 11011000001_{2}
- Ternary: 2101001_{3}
- Senary: 12001_{6}
- Octal: 3301_{8}
- Duodecimal: 1001_{12}
- Hexadecimal: 6C1_{16}

1729 is the natural number following 1728 and preceding 1730. It is the first nontrivial taxicab number, expressed as the sum of two cubic positive integers in two different ways. It is known as the Ramanujan number or Hardy–Ramanujan number after G. H. Hardy and Srinivasa Ramanujan.

== In mathematics ==
1729 is a composite number, the first nontrivial taxicab number, a Carmichael number, and a centered cube number. It is also the smallest absolute Euler pseudoprime. It is palindromic in bases 12, 32, and 36.

1729 is the dimension of the Fourier transform on which the fastest known algorithm for multiplying two numbers is based. This is an example of a galactic algorithm.

1729 can be expressed as the quadratic form. Investigating pairs of its distinct integer values that represent every integer the same number of times, Schiemann found that such quadratic forms must be in four or more variables, and the least possible discriminant of a four-variable pair is 1729.

1729 is the first number in the sequence of "Fermat near misses" defined, in reference to Fermat's Last Theorem, as numbers of the form $1 + z^3$ which are also expressible as the sum of two other cubes.

== Ramanujan number ==
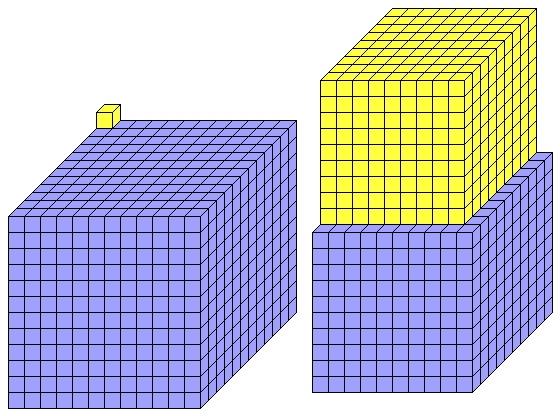
1729 can be expressed as a sum of two positive cubes in two ways, illustrated geometrically.

1729 is also known as Ramanujan number or Hardy–Ramanujan number, named after an anecdote of the British mathematician G. H. Hardy when he visited Indian mathematician Srinivasa Ramanujan who was ill in hospital. In their conversation, Hardy stated that the number 1729 from a taxicab he rode was a "dull" number and "hopefully it is not unfavourable omen", but Ramanujan remarked that "it is a very interesting number; it is the smallest number expressible as the sum of two cubes in two different ways". This conversation led to the definition of the taxicab number as the smallest integer that can be expressed as a sum of two positive cubes in a given number of distinct ways. 1729 is the second taxicab number, expressed as $1^3 + 12^3$ and $9^3 + 10^3$.

1729 was later found in one of Ramanujan's notebooks dated years before the incident, and it was noted by French mathematician Frénicle de Bessy in 1657. A commemorative plaque now appears at the site of the Ramanujan–Hardy incident, at 2 Colinette Road in Putney.

== See also ==
- 1729 - a year
