= Decet =

Decet may refer to:

- Decet (music), a composition which requires ten musicians for a performance
- Decet Romanum Pontificem (1521), the papal bull excommunicating Martin Luther
- Romanum decet pontificem, a papal bull issued by Pope Innocent XII (1691—1700) on June 22, 1692, banning the office of Cardinal Nephew
