= Théophile Pépin =

French mathematician (1826-1904)

Jean François Théophile Pépin (14 May 1826 – 3 April 1904) was a French mathematician.

Born in Cluses, Haute-Savoie, he became a Jesuit in 1846, and from 1850 to 1856 and from 1862 to 1871 he was Professor of Mathematics at various Jesuit colleges. He was appointed Professor of Canon Law in 1873, moving to Rome in 1880. He died in Lyon at the age of 77.

His work centred on number theory. In 1876 he found a new proof of Fermat's Last Theorem for n = 7, and in 1880 he published the first general solution to Frénicle de Bessy's problem

x^{2} + y^{2} = z^{2}, x^{2} = u^{2} + v^{2}, x − y = u − v.

He also gave his name to Pépin's test, a test of primality for Fermat numbers.

== Bibliography ==
- Franz Lemmermeyer. "A Note on Pépin's counter examples to the Hasse principle for curves of genus 1." Abh. Math. Sem. Hamburg 69 (1999), 335–345.
