= Map (graph theory) =

A map with twelve pentagonal faces

In topology and graph theory, a map is a subdivision of a surface such as the Euclidean plane into interior-disjoint regions, formed by embedding a graph onto the surface and forming connected components (faces) of the complement of the graph. That is, it is a tessellation of the surface. A map graph is a graph derived from a map by creating a vertex for each face and an edge for each pair of faces that meet at a vertex or edge of the embedded graph.
