= Sheriff's Assize of Ale =

Civic charity event in England

The Sheriff's Assize of Ale is a charity event that takes place in the English cities of York and Gloucester, led by the sheriff in each city.

In modern York, the event takes place in August each year.

The tradition in Gloucester was reinstated in 2003 by the then sheriff of Gloucester.
