= Nonet =

Nonet may refer to:

- Nonet (music), a composition which requires nine musicians for a performance
  - Nonet (Farrenc) (1849) by Louise Farrenc
  - Nonet (Lachner) (1875) by Franz Lachner
  - Nonet (Villa-Lobos) (1923) by Heitor Villa-Libos
  - Wind Nonet (Parry) (1877) by Hubert Parry
- Nonet, a nine line poem, with the first line containing nine syllables, the next eight, so on until the last line has one syllable; see Glossary of poetry terms
- Nonet, a proton nuclear magnetic resonance spectrum structure with nine peaks
- Nonet, a representation of subatomic particles in the quark model
- Nonet, another term for a box or region in sudoku, usually a 3x3 subsection
