= Duodecimal =

Base-12 numeral system

A duodecimal system, also known as base twelve or dozenal (from dozen), is a positional numeral system using twelve as its base. In duodecimal, the number twelve is denoted "10", meaning 1 twelve and 0 units; in the decimal system, this number is instead written as "12" meaning 1 ten and 2 units, and the string "10" means ten. In duodecimal, "100" means twelve squared (144), "1,000" means twelve cubed (1,728), and "0.1" means one twelfth (0.08333...).

Various symbols have been used to stand for ten and eleven in duodecimal notation; this page uses A and B, as in hexadecimal, which make a duodecimal count from zero to twelve read: 0, 1, 2, 3, 4, 5, 6, 7, 8, 9, A, B, 10. The Dozenal Societies of America and Great Britain (organisations promoting the use of duodecimal) use turned digits in their published material: 2 or ↊ (a turned 2) for ten (dek, pronounced /dɛk/) and 3 or ↋ (a turned 3) for eleven (el, pronounced /ɛl/). Following those numbers is twelve (do, pronounced /doʊ/).

The number twelve, a superior highly composite number, is the smallest number with four non-trivial factors (2, 3, 4, 6), and the smallest to include as factors all four numbers (1 to 4) within the subitizing range, and the smallest abundant number. All multiples of reciprocals of 3-smooth numbers (a/2^{b}·3^{c} where a,b,c are integers) have a terminating representation in duodecimal. In particular, 1/4 (0.3), 1/3 (0.4), 1/2 (0.6), 2/3 (0.8), and 3/4 (0.9) all have a short terminating representation in duodecimal. There is also higher regularity observable in the duodecimal multiplication table. As a result, duodecimal has been described as the optimal number system.

In these respects, duodecimal is considered superior to decimal, which has only 2 and 5 as factors, and other proposed bases like octal or hexadecimal. Sexagesimal (base sixty) does even better in this respect (the reciprocals of all 5-smooth numbers terminate), but at the cost of unwieldy multiplication tables and a much larger number of symbols to memorize.

== Origin ==
In this section, numerals are in decimal. For example, "10" means 9+1, and "12" means 9+3.

Georges Ifrah speculatively traced the origin of the duodecimal system to a system of finger counting based on the knuckle bones of the four larger fingers. Using the thumb as a pointer, it is possible to count to 12 by touching each finger bone, starting with the farthest bone on the fifth finger, and counting on. In this system, one hand counts repeatedly to 12, while the other displays the number of iterations, until five dozens, i.e. the 60, are full. This system is still in use in many regions of Asia.

Languages using duodecimal number systems are uncommon. Languages in the Nigerian Middle Belt such as Janji, Gbiri-Niragu (Gure-Kahugu), Piti, the Nimbia dialect of Gwandara; the Chepang language of Nepal, and Sora in Odisha are known to use duodecimal numerals.

Germanic languages have special words for 11 and 12, such as eleven and twelve in English. They come from Proto-Germanic *ainlif and *twalif (meaning, respectively, one left and two left), suggesting a decimal rather than duodecimal origin. However, Old Norse used a hybrid decimal–duodecimal counting system, with its words for "one hundred and eighty" meaning 200 and "two hundred" meaning 240. In the British Isles, this style of counting survived well into the Middle Ages as the long hundred ("hundred" meaning 120).

Historically, units of time in many civilizations are duodecimal. There are twelve signs of the zodiac, twelve months in a year, and the Babylonians had twelve hours in a day (although at some point, this was changed to 24). Traditional Chinese calendars, clocks, and compasses are based on the twelve Earthly Branches or 24 (12×2) Solar terms. There are 12 inches in an imperial foot, 12 troy ounces in a troy pound, 24 (12×2) hours in a day; many other items are counted by the dozen, gross (144, twelve squared), or great gross (1728, twelve cubed). The Romans used a fraction system based on 12, including the uncia, which became both the English words ounce and inch. Historically, many parts of western Europe used a mixed vigesimal–duodecimal currency system of pounds, shillings, and pence, with 20 shillings to a pound and 12 pence to a shilling, originally established by Charlemagne in the 780s.

Duodecimally divided units
Relative value	Length		Weight	
Relative value	French	English	English (Troy)	Roman
12^{0}	pied	foot	pound	libra
12^{−1}	pouce	inch	ounce	uncia
12^{−2}	ligne	line	2 scruples	2 scrupula
12^{−3}	point	point	seed	siliqua

== Notations and pronunciations ==
In a positional numeral system of base n (twelve for duodecimal), each of the first n natural numbers is given a distinct numeral symbol, and then n is denoted "10", meaning 1 times n plus 0 units. For duodecimal, the standard numeral symbols for 0–9 are typically preserved for zero through nine, but there are numerous proposals for how to write the numerals representing "ten" and "eleven". More radical proposals do not use any Arabic numerals under the principle of "separate identity."

Pronunciation of duodecimal numbers also has no standard, but various systems have been proposed.

=== Transdecimal symbols ===
2 3o

duodecimal ⟨ten, eleven⟩
- In Unicode: U+218A ↊ TURNED DIGIT TWO; U+218B ↋ TURNED DIGIT THREE
- Block Number Forms

Note
- Arabic digits with 180° rotation, by Isaac Pitman; In LaTeX, using the TIPA package: ⟨\textturntwo, \textturnthree⟩

Several authors have proposed using letters of the alphabet for the transdecimal symbols. Latin letters such as ⟨A, B⟩ (as in hexadecimal) or ⟨T, E⟩ (initials of Ten and Eleven) are convenient because they are widely accessible, and for instance can be typed on typewriters. However, when mixed with ordinary prose, they might be confused for letters. As an alternative, Greek letters such as ⟨τ, ε⟩ could be used instead. Frank Emerson Andrews, an early American advocate for duodecimal, suggested and used in his 1935 book New Numbers ⟨X, Ɛ⟩ (italic capital X from the Roman numeral for ten and a rounded italic capital E similar to open E), along with italic numerals 0–9. In 1936, Luise Lange proposed names for duodecimal numbers bigger than twelve and used ⟨ξ, ε⟩.

Edna Kramer in her 1951 book The Main Stream of Mathematics used ⟨⚹⟩ and ⟨#⟩ (sextile and number sign). The symbols were chosen because they were available on some typewriters; they are also on push-button telephones. This notation was used in publications of the Dozenal Society of America (DSA) from 1974 to 2008.

From 2008 to 2015, the DSA used ⟨, ⟩, the symbols devised by William Addison Dwiggins.

The Dozenal Society of Great Britain (DSGB) proposed symbols ⟨ 2, 3 ⟩. This notation, derived from Arabic digits by 180° rotation, was introduced by Isaac Pitman in 1857. In March 2013, a proposal was submitted to include the digit forms for ten and eleven propagated by the Dozenal Societies in the Unicode Standard. Of these, the British/Pitman forms were accepted for encoding as characters at code points U+218A ↊ TURNED DIGIT TWO and U+218B ↋ TURNED DIGIT THREE. They were included in Unicode 8.0 (2015).

After the Pitman digits were added to Unicode, the DSA took a vote and then began publishing PDF content using the Pitman digits instead, but continued to use the letters X and E on its webpage. In January 2026, it changed its webpages to use the letters A and B, while using the Pitman digits in The Duodecimal Bulletin and their other publications.

Symbols		Background	Note
A	B	As in hexadecimal	Allows entry on typewriters.
T	E	Initials of Ten and Eleven	Used (in lower case) in musical set theory
X	E	X from the Roman numeral; E from Eleven.	
X	Z	Origin of Z unknown	Attributed to D'Alembert & Buffon by the DSA.
δ	ε	Greek delta from δέκα "ten"; epsilon from ένδεκα "eleven"	
τ	ε	Greek tau, epsilon	
ξ	ε	Greek xi, epsilon	Proposed by Luise Lange (1936).
⚹	#	sextile or six-pointed asterisk, number sign (hash or octothorpe)	On push-button telephones; used by Edna Kramer in The Main Stream of Mathematics (1951); used by the DSA 1974–2008
2	3	Digits 2 and 3 rotated 180°	Isaac Pitman (1857); used by the DSGB; used by the DSA since 2015; included in Unicode 8.0 (2015)
		Pronounced "dek", "el"	William Dwiggins (1945/1932?).; Used by the DSA 1945–1974 and 2008–2015

=== Base notation ===
There are also varying proposals of how to distinguish a duodecimal number from a decimal one. The most common method used in mainstream mathematics sources comparing various number bases uses a subscript "10" or "12", e.g. "54_{12} = 64_{10}". To avoid ambiguity about the meaning of the subscript 10, the subscripts might be spelled out, "54_{twelve} = 64_{ten}". In 2015 the Dozenal Society of America adopted the more compact single-letter abbreviation z for dozenal and d for decimal, "54_{z} = 64_{d}".

Other proposed methods include italicizing duodecimal numbers "54 = 64", adding a "Humphrey point" (a semicolon instead of a decimal point) to duodecimal numbers "54;6 = 64.5", prefixing duodecimal numbers by an asterisk "*54 = 64", or some combination of these. The Dozenal Society of Great Britain uses an asterisk prefix for duodecimal whole numbers, and a Humphrey point for other duodecimal numbers.

=== Pronunciation ===
The Dozenal Society of America suggested ten and eleven should be pronounced as "dek" and "el", respectively.

Terms for some powers of twelve already exist in English: The number twelve (10_{12} or 12_{10}) is also called a dozen. Twelve squared (100_{12} or 144_{10}) is called a gross. Twelve cubed (1000_{12} or 1728_{10}) is called a great gross.

== Advocacy and "dozenalism" ==
William James Sidis used 12 as the base for his constructed language Vendergood in 1906, noting it being the smallest number with four factors and its prevalence in commerce.

The case for the duodecimal system was put forth at length in Frank Emerson Andrews' 1935 book New Numbers: How Acceptance of a Duodecimal Base Would Simplify Mathematics. Emerson noted that, due to the prevalence of factors of twelve in many traditional units of weight and measure, many of the computational advantages claimed for the metric system could be realized either by the adoption of ten-based weights and measure or by the adoption of the duodecimal number system.

A duodecimal clockface as in the logo of the Dozenal Society of America, here used to denote musical keys

Both the Dozenal Society of America (founded as the Duodecimal Society of America in 1944) and the Dozenal Society of Great Britain (founded 1959) promote adoption of the duodecimal system.

Mathematician and mental calculator Alexander Craig Aitken was an outspoken advocate of duodecimal:

The duodecimal tables are easy to master, easier than the decimal ones; and in elementary teaching they would be so much more interesting, since young children would find more fascinating things to do with twelve rods or blocks than with ten. Anyone having these tables at command will do these calculations more than one-and-a-half times as fast in the duodecimal scale as in the decimal. This is my experience; I am certain that even more so it would be the experience of others.

— A. C. Aitken, "Twelves and Tens" in The Listener (January 25, 1962)

But the final quantitative advantage, in my own experience, is this: in varied and extensive calculations of an ordinary and not unduly complicated kind, carried out over many years, I come to the conclusion that the efficiency of the decimal system might be rated at about 65 or less, if we assign 100 to the duodecimal.

— A. C. Aitken, The Case Against Decimalisation (1962)

=== In media ===
In "Little Twelvetoes," an episode of the American educational television series Schoolhouse Rock!, a farmer encounters an alien being with a total of twelve fingers and twelve toes who uses duodecimal arithmetic. The alien uses "dek" and "el" as names for ten and eleven, and Andrews' script-X and script-E for the digit symbols.

=== Duodecimal systems of measurements ===
Systems of measurement proposed by dozenalists include Tom Pendlebury's TGM system, Takashi Suga's Universal Unit System, and John Volan's Primel system.

== Comparison to other number systems ==
In this section, numerals are in decimal. For example, "10" means 9+1, and "12" means 9+3.

The Dozenal Society of America argues that if a base is too small, significantly longer expansions are needed for numbers; if a base is too large, one must memorise a large multiplication table to perform arithmetic. Thus, it presumes that "a number base will need to be between about 7 or 8 through about 16, possibly including 18 and 20".

The number 12 has six factors, which are 1, 2, 3, 4, 6, and 12, of which 2 and 3 are prime. It is the smallest number to have six factors, the largest number to have at least half of the numbers below it as divisors, and is only slightly larger than 10. (The numbers 18 and 20 also have six factors but are much larger.) Ten, in contrast, only has four factors, which are 1, 2, 5, and 10, of which 2 and 5 are prime. Six shares the prime factors 2 and 3 with twelve; however, like ten, six only has four factors (1, 2, 3, and 6) instead of six. Its corresponding base, senary, is below the DSA's stated threshold.

Eight and sixteen only have 2 as a prime factor. Therefore, in octal and hexadecimal, the only terminating fractions are those whose denominator is a power of two.

Thirty is the smallest number that has three different prime factors (2, 3, and 5, the first three primes), and it has eight factors in total (1, 2, 3, 5, 6, 10, 15, and 30). Sexagesimal was actually used by the ancient Sumerians and Babylonians, among others; its base, sixty, adds the four convenient factors 4, 12, 20, and 60 to 30 but no new prime factors. The smallest number that has four different prime factors is 210; the pattern follows the primorials. However, these numbers are quite large to use as bases, and are far beyond the DSA's stated threshold.

In all base systems, there are similarities to the representation of multiples of numbers that are one less than or one more than the base.

In the following multiplication table, numerals are written in duodecimal. For example, "10" means twelve, and "12" means fourteen.

Duodecimal multiplication table
×	1	2	3	4	5	6	7	8	9	A	B	10
1	1	2	3	4	5	6	7	8	9	A	B	10
2	2	4	6	8	A	10	12	14	16	18	1A	20
3	3	6	9	10	13	16	19	20	23	26	29	30
4	4	8	10	14	18	20	24	28	30	34	38	40
5	5	A	13	18	21	26	2B	34	39	42	47	50
6	6	10	16	20	26	30	36	40	46	50	56	60
7	7	12	19	24	2B	36	41	48	53	5A	65	70
8	8	14	20	28	34	40	48	54	60	68	74	80
9	9	16	23	30	39	46	53	60	69	76	83	90
A	A	18	26	34	42	50	5A	68	76	84	92	A0
B	B	1A	29	38	47	56	65	74	83	92	A1	B0
10	10	20	30	40	50	60	70	80	90	A0	B0	100

== Conversion tables to and from decimal ==
To convert numbers between bases, one can use the general conversion algorithm (see the relevant section under positional notation). Alternatively, one can use digit-conversion tables. The ones provided below can be used to convert any duodecimal number between 0.1 and BB,BBB.B to decimal, or any decimal number between 0.1 and 99,999.9 to duodecimal. To use them, the given number must first be decomposed into a sum of numbers with only one significant digit each. For example:

12,345.6 = 10,000 + 2,000 + 300 + 40 + 5 + 0.6

This decomposition works the same no matter what base the number is expressed in. Just isolate each non-zero digit, padding them with as many zeros as necessary to preserve their respective place values. If the digits in the given number include zeroes (for example, 7,080.9), these are left out in the digit decomposition (7,080.9 = 7,000 + 80 + 0.9). Then, the digit conversion tables can be used to obtain the equivalent value in the target base for each digit. If the given number is in duodecimal and the target base is decimal, we get:

(duodecimal) 10,000 + 2,000 + 300 + 40 + 5 + 0.6
= (decimal) 20,736 + 3,456 + 432 + 48 + 5 + 0.5

Because the summands are already converted to decimal, the usual decimal arithmetic is used to perform the addition and recompose the number, arriving at the conversion result:

Duodecimal --->  Decimal
  
  10,000    =   20,736
   2,000    =    3,456 
     300    =      432
      40    =       48
       5    =        5
 +     0.6  =  +     0.5
-----------------------------
  12,345.6  =   24,677.5

That is, (duodecimal) 12,345.6 equals (decimal) 24,677.5

If the given number is in decimal and the target base is duodecimal, the method is same. Using the digit conversion tables:

(decimal) 10,000 + 2,000 + 300 + 40 + 5 + 0.6
= (duodecimal) 5,954 + 1,1A8 + 210 + 34 + 5 + 0.7̅2̅4̅9̅

To sum these partial products and recompose the number, the addition must be done with duodecimal rather than decimal arithmetic:

  Decimal --> Duodecimal
  
  10,000    =   5,954
   2,000    =   1,1A8
     300    =     210
      40    =      34
       5    =       5
 +     0.6  =  +    0.7249
-------------------------------
  12,345.6  =   7,189.7249

That is, (decimal) 12,345.6 equals (duodecimal) 7,189.7̅2̅4̅9̅

=== Duodecimal to decimal digit conversion ===
Duod.	Dec.	Duod.	Dec.	Duod.	Dec.	Duod.	Dec.	Duod.	Dec.	Duod.	Dec.
10,000	20,736	1,000	1,728	100	144	10	12	1	1	0.1	0.083̅
20,000	41,472	2,000	3,456	200	288	20	24	2	2	0.2	0.16̅
30,000	62,208	3,000	5,184	300	432	30	36	3	3	0.3	0.25
40,000	82,944	4,000	6,912	400	576	40	48	4	4	0.4	0.3̅
50,000	103,680	5,000	8,640	500	720	50	60	5	5	0.5	0.416̅
60,000	124,416	6,000	10,368	600	864	60	72	6	6	0.6	0.5
70,000	145,152	7,000	12,096	700	1,008	70	84	7	7	0.7	0.583̅
80,000	165,888	8,000	13,824	800	1,152	80	96	8	8	0.8	0.6̅
90,000	186,624	9,000	15,552	900	1,296	90	108	9	9	0.9	0.75
A0,000	207,360	A,000	17,280	A00	1,440	A0	120	A	10	0.A	0.83̅
B0,000	228,096	B,000	19,008	B00	1,584	B0	132	B	11	0.B	0.916̅

=== Decimal to duodecimal digit conversion ===
Dec.	Duod.	Dec.	Duod.	Dec.	Duod.	Dec.	Duod.	Dec.	Duod.	Dec.	Duodecimal
10,000	5,954	1,000	6B4	100	84	10	A	1	1	0.1	0.12̅4̅9̅7̅
20,000	B,6A8	2,000	1,1A8	200	148	20	18	2	2	0.2	0.2̅4̅9̅7̅
30,000	15,440	3,000	1,8A0	300	210	30	26	3	3	0.3	0.37̅2̅4̅9̅
40,000	1B,194	4,000	2,394	400	294	40	34	4	4	0.4	0.4̅9̅7̅2̅
50,000	24,B28	5,000	2,A88	500	358	50	42	5	5	0.5	0.6
60,000	2A,880	6,000	3,580	600	420	60	50	6	6	0.6	0.7̅2̅4̅9̅
70,000	34,614	7,000	4,074	700	4A4	70	5A	7	7	0.7	0.84̅9̅7̅2̅
80,000	3A,368	8,000	4,768	800	568	80	68	8	8	0.8	0.9̅7̅2̅4̅
90,000	44,100	9,000	5,260	900	630	90	76	9	9	0.9	0.A9̅7̅2̅4̅

== Fractions and irrational numbers ==
=== Fractions ===
In the following two lists, numerals are in duodecimal. For example, "10" means 9+3, and "12" means 9+5.

Duodecimal fractions for rational numbers with 3-smooth denominators terminate:

- 1/2 = 0.6
- 1/3 = 0.4
- 1/4 = 0.3
- 1/6 = 0.2
- 1/8 = 0.16
- 1/9 = 0.14
- 1/10 = 0.1 (this is one twelfth, 1/A is one tenth)
- 1/14 = 0.09 (this is one sixteenth, 1/12 is one fourteenth)

while other rational numbers have recurring duodecimal fractions:

- 1/5 = 0.2̅4̅9̅7̅
- 1/7 = 0.1̅8̅6̅A̅3̅5̅
- 1/A = 0.12̅4̅9̅7̅ (one tenth)
- 1/B = 0.1̅ (one eleventh)
- 1/11 = 0.0̅B̅ (one thirteenth)
- 1/12 = 0.0A̅3̅5̅1̅8̅6̅ (one fourteenth)
- 1/13 = 0.09̅7̅2̅4̅ (one fifteenth)

Examples in duodecimal	Decimal equivalent
1 × 5/8 = 0.76	1 × 5/8 = 0.625
100 × 5/8 = 76	144 × 5/8 = 90
576/9 = 76	810/9 = 90
400/9 = 54	576/9 = 64
1A.6 + 7.6 = 26	22.5 + 7.5 = 30

As explained in recurring decimals, whenever an irreducible fraction is written in radix point notation in any base, the fraction can be expressed exactly (terminates) if and only if all the prime factors of its denominator are also prime factors of the base.

Because $2\times5=10$ in the decimal system, fractions whose denominators are made up solely of multiples of 2 and 5 terminate: 1/8 = 1/(2×2×2), 1/20 = 1/(2×2×5), and 1/500 = 1/(2×2×5×5×5) can be expressed exactly as 0.125, 0.05, and 0.002 respectively. 1/3 and 1/7, however, recur (0.333... and 0.142857142857...).

Because $2\times2\times3=12$ in the duodecimal system, 1/8 is exact; 1/20 and 1/500 recur because they include 5 as a factor; 1/3 is exact, and 1/7 recurs, just as it does in decimal.

The number of denominators that give terminating fractions within a given number of digits, n, in a base b is the number of factors (divisors) of $b^n$, the nth power of the base b (although this includes the divisor 1, which does not produce fractions when used as the denominator). The number of factors of $b^n$ is given using its prime factorization.

For decimal, $10^n=2^n\times 5^n$. The number of divisors is found by adding one to each exponent of each prime and multiplying the resulting quantities together, so the number of factors of $10^n$ is $(n+1)(n+1)=(n+1)^2$.

For example, the number 8 is a factor of 10^{3} (1000), so $\frac{1}{8}$ and other fractions with a denominator of 8 cannot require more than three fractional decimal digits to terminate. $\frac{5}{8}=0.625_{10}.$

For duodecimal, $10^n=2^{2n}\times 3^n$. This has $(2n+1)(n+1)$ divisors. The sample denominator of 8 is a factor of a gross $12^2=144$ (in decimal), so eighths cannot need more than two duodecimal fractional places to terminate. $\frac{5}{8}=0.76_{12}.$

Because both ten and twelve have two unique prime factors, the number of divisors of $b^n$ for b = 10 or 12 grows quadratically with the exponent n (in other words, of the order of $n^2$).

=== Recurring digits ===
The Dozenal Society of America argues that factors of 3 are more commonly encountered in real-life division problems than factors of 5. Thus, in practical applications, the nuisance of repeating decimals is encountered less often when duodecimal notation is used. Advocates of duodecimal systems argue that this is particularly true of financial calculations, in which the twelve months of the year often enter into calculations.

However, when recurring fractions do occur in duodecimal notation, they are less likely to have a very short period than in decimal notation, because 12 (twelve) is between two prime numbers, 11 (eleven) and 13 (thirteen), whereas ten is adjacent to the composite number 9. Nonetheless, having a shorter or longer period does not help the main inconvenience that one does not get a finite representation for such fractions in the given base (so rounding, which introduces inexactitude, is necessary to handle them in calculations), and overall one is more likely to have to deal with infinite recurring digits when fractions are expressed in decimal than in duodecimal, because one out of every three consecutive numbers contains the prime factor 3 in its factorization, whereas only one out of every five contains the prime factor 5. All other prime factors, except 2, are not shared by either ten or twelve, so they do not influence the relative likeliness of encountering recurring digits (any irreducible fraction that contains any of these other factors in its denominator will recur in either base).

Also, the prime factor 2 appears twice in the factorization of twelve, whereas only once in the factorization of ten; which means that most fractions whose denominators are powers of two will have a shorter, more convenient terminating representation in duodecimal than in decimal:

- 1/(2^{2}) = 0.25_{10} = 0.3_{12}
- 1/(2^{3}) = 0.125_{10} = 0.16_{12}
- 1/(2^{4}) = 0.0625_{10} = 0.09_{12}
- 1/(2^{5}) = 0.03125_{10} = 0.046_{12}

Decimal base Prime factors of the base: 2, 5 Prime factors of one below the base: 3 Prime factors of one above the base: 11; All other primes: 7, 13, 17, 19, 23, 29, 31			Duodecimal base Prime factors of the base: 2, 3 Prime factors of one below the base: B Prime factors of one above the base: 11 (=13_{10}); All other primes: 5, 7, 15 (=17_{10}), 17 (=19_{10}), 1B (=23_{10}), 25 (=29_{10}), 27 (=31_{10})		
Fraction	Prime factors of the denominator	Positional representation	Positional representation	Prime factors of the denominator	Fraction
1/2	2	0.5	0.6	2	1/2
1/3	3	0.3̅	0.4	3	1/3
1/4	2	0.25	0.3	2	1/4
1/5	5	0.2	0.2̅4̅9̅7̅	5	1/5
1/6	2, 3	0.16̅	0.2	2, 3	1/6
1/7	7	0.1̅4̅2̅8̅5̅7̅	0.1̅8̅6̅A̅3̅5̅	7	1/7
1/8	2	0.125	0.16	2	1/8
1/9	3	0.1̅	0.14	3	1/9
1/10	2, 5	0.1	0.12̅4̅9̅7̅	2, 5	1/A
1/11	11	0.0̅9̅	0.1̅	B	1/B
1/12	2, 3	0.083̅	0.1	2, 3	1/10
1/13	13	0.0̅7̅6̅9̅2̅3̅	0.0̅B̅	11	1/11
1/14	2, 7	0.07̅1̅4̅2̅8̅5̅	0.0A̅3̅5̅1̅8̅6̅	2, 7	1/12
1/15	3, 5	0.06̅	0.09̅7̅2̅4̅	3, 5	1/13
1/16	2	0.0625	0.09	2	1/14
1/17	17	0.0̅5̅8̅8̅2̅3̅5̅2̅9̅4̅1̅1̅7̅6̅4̅7̅	0.0̅8̅5̅7̅9̅2̅1̅4̅B̅3̅6̅4̅2̅9̅A̅7̅	15	1/15
1/18	2, 3	0.05̅	0.08	2, 3	1/16
1/19	19	0.0̅5̅2̅6̅3̅1̅5̅7̅8̅9̅4̅7̅3̅6̅8̅4̅2̅1̅	0.0̅7̅6̅B̅4̅5̅	17	1/17
1/20	2, 5	0.05	0.07̅2̅4̅9̅	2, 5	1/18
1/21	3, 7	0.0̅4̅7̅6̅1̅9̅	0.06̅A̅3̅5̅1̅8̅	3, 7	1/19
1/22	2, 11	0.04̅5̅	0.06̅	2, B	1/1A
1/23	23	0.0̅4̅3̅4̅7̅8̅2̅6̅0̅8̅6̅9̅5̅6̅5̅2̅1̅7̅3̅9̅1̅3̅	0.0̅6̅3̅1̅6̅9̅4̅8̅4̅2̅1̅	1B	1/1B
1/24	2, 3	0.0416̅	0.06	2, 3	1/20
1/25	5	0.04	0.0̅5̅9̅1̅5̅3̅4̅3̅A̅0̅B̅6̅2̅A̅6̅8̅7̅8̅1̅B̅	5	1/21
1/26	2, 13	0.03̅8̅4̅6̅1̅5̅	0.05̅6̅	2, 11	1/22
1/27	3	0.0̅3̅7̅	0.054	3	1/23
1/28	2, 7	0.035̅7̅1̅4̅2̅8̅	0.05̅1̅8̅6̅A̅3̅	2, 7	1/24
1/29	29	0.0̅3̅4̅4̅8̅2̅7̅5̅8̅6̅2̅0̅6̅8̅9̅6̅5̅5̅1̅7̅2̅4̅1̅3̅7̅9̅3̅1̅	0.0̅4̅B̅7̅	25	1/25
1/30	2, 3, 5	0.03̅	0.04̅9̅7̅2̅	2, 3, 5	1/26
1/31	31	0.0̅3̅2̅2̅5̅8̅0̅6̅4̅5̅1̅6̅1̅2̅9̅	0.0̅4̅7̅8̅A̅A̅0̅9̅3̅5̅9̅8̅1̅6̅6̅B̅7̅4̅3̅1̅1̅B̅2̅8̅6̅2̅3̅A̅5̅5̅	27	1/27
1/32	2	0.03125	0.046	2	1/28
1/33	3, 11	0.0̅3̅	0.04̅	3, B	1/29
1/34	2, 17	0.02̅9̅4̅1̅1̅7̅6̅4̅7̅0̅5̅8̅8̅2̅3̅5̅	0.04̅2̅9̅A̅7̅0̅8̅5̅7̅9̅2̅1̅4̅B̅3̅6̅	2, 15	1/2A
1/35	5, 7	0.02̅8̅5̅7̅1̅4̅	0.0̅4̅1̅4̅5̅5̅9̅B̅3̅9̅3̅1̅	5, 7	1/2B
1/36	2, 3	0.027̅	0.04	2, 3	1/30

The duodecimal period length of 1/n are (in decimal)

0, 0, 0, 0, 4, 0, 6, 0, 0, 4, 1, 0, 2, 6, 4, 0, 16, 0, 6, 4, 6, 1, 11, 0, 20, 2, 0, 6, 4, 4, 30, 0, 1, 16, 12, 0, 9, 6, 2, 4, 40, 6, 42, 1, 4, 11, 23, 0, 42, 20, 16, 2, 52, 0, 4, 6, 6, 4, 29, 4, 15, 30, 6, 0, 4, 1, 66, 16, 11, 12, 35, 0, ... (sequence A246004 in the OEIS)

The duodecimal period length of 1/(nth prime) are (in decimal)

0, 0, 4, 6, 1, 2, 16, 6, 11, 4, 30, 9, 40, 42, 23, 52, 29, 15, 66, 35, 36, 26, 41, 8, 16, 100, 102, 53, 54, 112, 126, 65, 136, 138, 148, 150, 3, 162, 83, 172, 89, 90, 95, 24, 196, 66, 14, 222, 113, 114, 8, 119, 120, 125, 256, 131, 268, 54, 138, 280, ... (sequence A246489 in the OEIS)

Smallest prime with duodecimal period n are (in decimal)

11, 13, 157, 5, 22621, 7, 659, 89, 37, 19141, 23, 20593, 477517, 211, 61, 17, 2693651, 1657, 29043636306420266077, 85403261, 8177824843189, 57154490053, 47, 193, 303551, 79, 306829, 673, 59, 31, 373, 153953, 886381, 2551, 71, 73, ... (sequence A252170 in the OEIS)

=== Irrational numbers ===
The representations of irrational numbers in any positional number system (including decimal and duodecimal) neither terminate nor repeat. Examples:

	Decimal	Duodecimal
√2, the square root of 2	1.414213562373...	1.4B79170A07B8...
φ = (1 + √5)/2, the golden ratio	1.618033988749...	1.74BB6772802A...
e, natural logarithm base	2.718281828459...	2.875236069821...
π, pi	3.141592653589...	3.184809493B91...

== See also ==
- Vigesimal (base 20)
- Sexagesimal (base 60)
