= Gross (unit) =

Group of 144; a dozen dozen

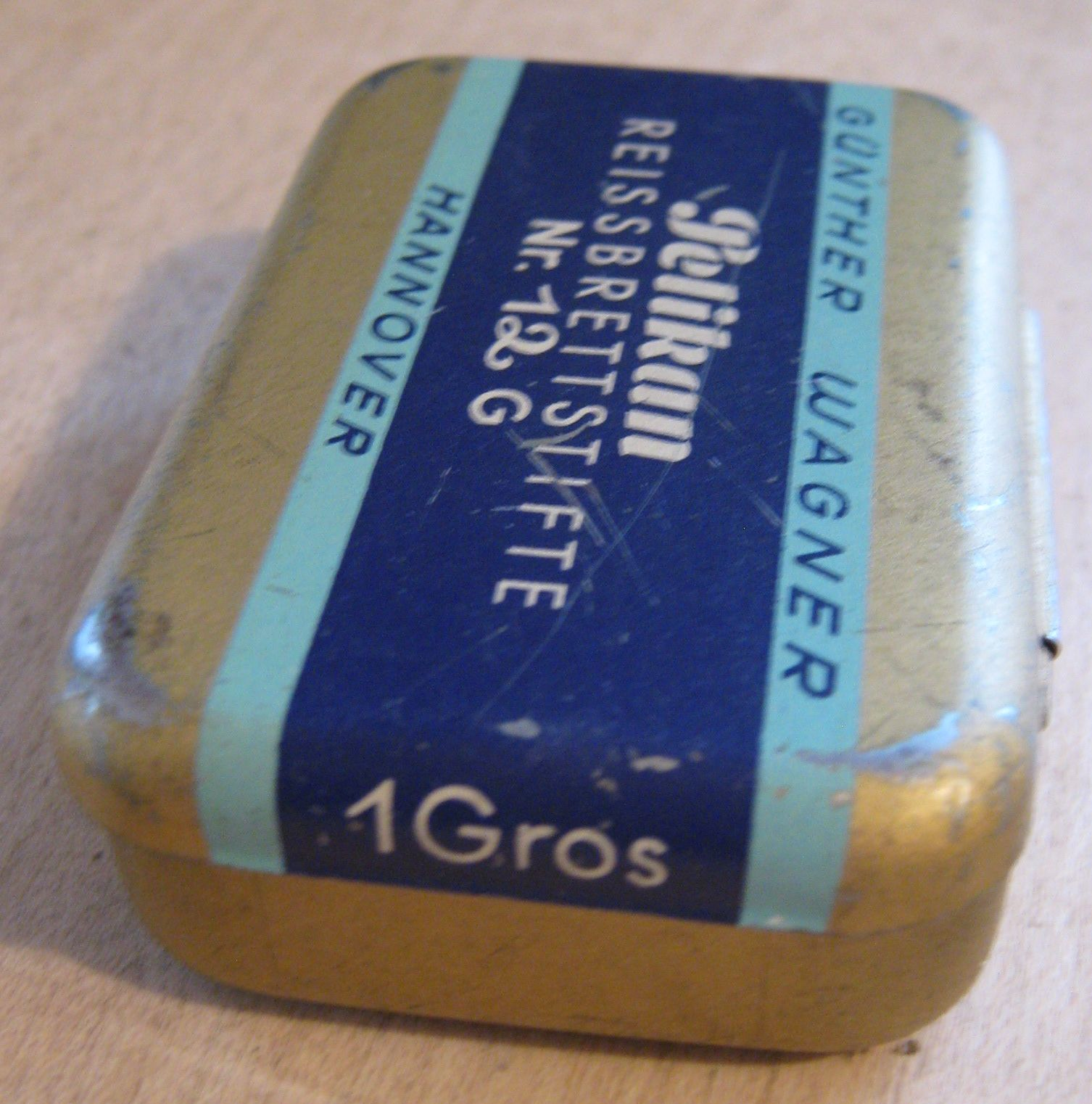
A Pelikan metal tin of drawing board pencils, labeled "1 Gross" (1 large)

In English and related languages, several terms involving the words "great" or "gross" relate to numbers involving a multiple of exponents of twelve (dozen):

- A gross is a group of 144 items (a dozen dozen or a square dozen, 12^{2}).
- A great gross is a group of 1,728 items (a dozen gross or a cubic dozen, 12^{3}).
- A small gross or a great hundred is a group of 120 items (ten dozen, 10×12).

The term can be abbreviated gr. or gro., and dates from the early 15th century. It derives from the Old French grosse douzaine, meaning "large dozen”. The continued use of these terms in measurement and counting represents the duodecimal number system. This has led groups such as the Dozenal Society of America to advocate for wider use of "gross" and related terms instead of the decimal system.

== See also ==
- Long hundred
