= 1728 (number) =

← 1727	1728	1729 →
- List of numbers; Integers; ← 0 1k 2k 3k 4k 5k 6k 7k 8k 9k →
- Cardinal: one thousand seven hundred twenty-eight
- Ordinal: 1728th (one thousand seven hundred twenty-eighth)
- Factorization: 2^{6} × 3^{3}
- Divisors: 1, 2, 3, 4, 6, 8, 9, 12, 16, 18, 24, 27, 32, 36, 48, 54, 64, 72, 96, 108, 144, 192, 216, 288, 432, 576, 864, 1728
- Greek numeral: ,ΑΨΚΗ´
- Roman numeral: MDCCXXVIII, mdccxxviii
- Binary: 11011000000_{2}
- Ternary: 2101000_{3}
- Senary: 12000_{6}
- Octal: 3300_{8}
- Duodecimal: 1000_{12}
- Hexadecimal: 6C0_{16}

1728 is the natural number following 1727 and preceding 1729. It is a dozen gross, or one great gross (or grand gross). It is also the number of cubic inches in a cubic foot.

== In mathematics ==
1728 is the cube of 12, and therefore equal to the product of the six divisors of 12 (1, 2, 3, 4, 6, 12). It is also the product of the first four composite numbers (4, 6, 8, and 9), which makes it a compositorial. As a cubic perfect power, it is also a highly powerful number that has a record value (18) between the product of the exponents (3 and 6) in its prime factorization.

$$\begin{align}
1728& = 3^{3} \times4^{3} = 2^{3} \times 6^{3} = \mathbf {12^{3}} \\
1728& = 6^{3} + 8^{3} + 10^{3} \\
1728& = 24^{2} + 24^{2} + 24^{2} \\
\end{align}$$

It is also a Jordan–Pólya number such that it is a product of factorials: $2! \times (3!)^{2} \times4! = 1728$.

1728 has twenty-eight divisors, which is a perfect count (as with 12, with six divisors). It also has an Euler totient of 576 or 24^{2}, which divides 1728 thrice over.

1728 is an abundant and semiperfect number, as it is smaller than the sum of its proper divisors yet equal to the sum of a subset of its proper divisors.

It is a practical number as each smaller number is the sum of distinct divisors of 1728, and an integer-perfect number where its divisors can be partitioned into two disjoint sets with equal sum.

1728 is 3-smooth, since its only distinct prime factors are 2 and 3. This also makes 1728 a regular number which are most useful in the context of powers of 60, the smallest number with twelve divisors:

$$60^{3} = 216000 = 1728 \times 125 = 12^{3} \times 5^{3}$$.

1728 is also an untouchable number since there is no number whose sum of proper divisors is 1728.

Many relevant calculations involving 1728 are computed in the duodecimal number system, in-which it is represented as "1000". 1728 is palindromic in base 11 (1331_{11}) and in base 23 (363_{23}).

There are 1728 of directed open knight's tours in $5 \times 5$ minichess.

=== Modular j-invariant ===
1728 occurs in the algebraic formula for the j-invariant of an elliptic curve, as a function over a complex variable on the upper half-plane $\,\mathcal {H}: \{\tau \in \mathbb {C}, \text{ }\mathrm{Im}(\tau)>0\}$,

$$j(\tau) = 1728 \frac{g_2(\tau)^3}{\Delta(\tau)} = 1728 \frac{g_2(\tau)^3}{g_2(\tau)^3 - 27g_3(\tau)^2}$$.

Inputting a value of $2i$ for $\tau$, where $i$ is the imaginary number, yields another cubic integer:

$$j(2i) = 1728 \frac{g_2(2i)^3}{g_2(2i)^3 - 27g_3(2i)^2} = 66^3$$.

In moonshine theory, the first few terms in the Fourier q-expansion of the normalized j-invariant exapand as,

$$1728\text{ }j(\tau) = 1/q + 744 + 196884q + 21493760 q^2 + \cdots$$

The Griess algebra (which contains the friendly giant as its automorphism group) and all subsequent graded parts of its infinite-dimensional moonshine module hold dimensional representations whose values are the Fourier coefficients in this q-expansion.

== In culture ==
1728 is the number of daily chants of the Hare Krishna mantra by a Hare Krishna devotee. The number comes from 16 rounds on a 108-bead japamala.

== See also ==
- The year AD 1728
