= Long hundred =

120 (as in six score, rather than 100)

The long hundred, also known as the great hundred or twelfty, is the number 120 that was referred to as hund, hund-teontig, hundrað, hundrath, or hundred in Germanic languages prior to the 15th century, and is now known as one hundred (and) twenty. The number was translated into Latin in Germanic-speaking countries as centum (Roman numeral C), but the qualifier long is now added because English now uses hundred exclusively to refer to the number 100 instead.

The long thousand was reckoned decimally as 10 long hundreds (1200).

== English unit ==
The hundred (Latin: centena) was an English unit of measurement used in the production, sale and taxation of various items in the medieval kingdom of England. The value was often different from 100 units, mostly because of the continued medieval use of the Germanic long hundred of 120. The unit's use as a measure of weight is now described as a hundredweight, i.e. 112 pounds.

== History ==
The existence of a non-decimal base in the earliest traces of the Germanic languages is attested by the presence of glosses such as "tenty-wise" and "ten-count" to denote that certain numbers are to be understood as decimal. Such glosses would not be expected where decimal counting was usual. In the Gothic Bible, some marginalia glosses a five hundred (fimf hundram) in the text as being understood taihuntewjam ("tenty-wise"). Similar words are known in most other Germanic languages. Old Norse counted large numbers in twelves of tens, with its words "one hundred and eighty" (hundrað ok átta tigir) meaning 200, "two hundred" (tvau hundrað) meaning 240 and "thousand" (þúsund, Old English: þúsend) meaning 1200. The word to signify 100 (a "short hundred") was originally tíu tigir (lit. 'ten tens'). The use of the long hundred in medieval England and Scotland is documented by Stevenson and Goodare although the latter notes that it was sometimes avoided by using numbers such as "seven score".

The Assize of Weights and Measures, one of England's statutes of uncertain date from c. 1300, shows both the short and long hundred in competing use. The hundred of kippers is formed by 120 fish and the hundred of hemp canvas and linen cloth is formed by 120 ells, but the hundred of pounds, to be used in measuring bulk goods, is 100, and the hundred of fresh herring is 100 fish. Within the original Latin text, the numeral c. is used for a value of 120: Et quodlibet c. continet vi. xx. ("And each such 'hundred' contains six twenties.") Once the short hundred began coming into use, Old Norse referred to the long hundred as hundrað tolf-roett (lit. 'duodecimal hundred'), as opposed to the short hundrað ti-rætt (lit. 'decimal hundred').

Measuring by long hundreds declined as Arabic numerals, which require the uniform base 10, spread throughout Europe during and after the 14th century. In modern times, J. R. R. Tolkien's use of the long hundred system within The Lord of the Rings helped popularize the word eleventy in modern English, primarily as a colloquial word for an indefinitely large number.

== See also ==
- Hundredweight
- Short hundred
- Gross
