= Lander, Parkin, and Selfridge conjecture =

Unsolved conjecture on equal sums of like powers

Unsolved problem in mathematics
If $\sum_{i=1}^{m} x_i^k=\sum_{j=1}^{n} y_j^k$ holds in positive integers with no term common to both sides, must $m+n\geq k$?
More unsolved problems in mathematics

In number theory, the Lander, Parkin, and Selfridge conjecture (the LPS conjecture) is an unsolved conjecture about Diophantine equations involving equal sums of like powers. It predicts that every nontrivial equality

$$x_1^k+x_2^k+\cdots+x_m^k
=
y_1^k+y_2^k+\cdots+y_n^k$$

between sums of positive integer $k$th powers must contain at least $k$ terms in total; in other words,

$$m+n\geq k.$$

Here, “nontrivial” means that no term occurs on both sides after common terms have been cancelled. The statement arose from a question posed by Leon J. Lander, Thomas R. Parkin, and John Selfridge in their 1967 survey of equal sums of like powers.

The conjecture remains open. In particular, no nontrivial positive-integer solution is known to

$$a^5+b^5=c^5+d^5.$$

== Statement ==
Let $k\geq2$ and let $m,n\geq1$. Since the two sides may be interchanged, one may assume that $m\leq n$. Consider an equation

$$\sum_{i=1}^{m}x_i^k=\sum_{j=1}^{n}y_j^k,$$

where all the $x_i$ and $y_j$ are positive integers and

$$x_i\ne y_j$$

for every $i$ and $j$. Repetitions within the same side of the equation are not excluded. The LPS conjecture states that such an equation can have a solution only if

$$m+n\geq k.$$

An equation of this form is commonly described as having type $(k,m,n)$. The original survey used the notation $(k.m.n)$. A solution is called primitive if

$$\gcd(x_1,\ldots,x_m,y_1,\ldots,y_n)=1.$$

Every nonprimitive solution is obtained from a primitive one by multiplying all the bases by a common positive integer.

In the one-sided case $m=1$, the conjecture says that

$$a_1^k+a_2^k+\cdots+a_r^k=b^k
\quad\Longrightarrow\quad
r\geq k-1.$$

This is weaker by one summand than Euler's sum of powers conjecture, which asserted that $r\geq k$.

== Historical background ==
Euler's sum of powers conjecture was intended as a generalization of Fermat's Last Theorem. It asserted that a $k$th power could not be written as the sum of fewer than $k$ positive $k$th powers.

In 1966, Lander and Parkin disproved Euler's conjecture by finding

$$27^5+84^5+110^5+133^5=144^5.$$

This identity has only four summands on the left, contradicting Euler's proposed bound for fifth powers. However, it has five terms altogether, so it satisfies the later LPS bound with equality.

In their 1967 survey, Lander, Parkin, and Selfridge organized equations by type $(k,m,n)$ and asked, among other questions, whether such an equation is never solvable when $m+n<k$. The affirmative answer to that question became known as the Lander, Parkin, and Selfridge conjecture.

Euler's original conjecture was subsequently also disproved for fourth powers. Noam Elkies found a solution to

$$a^4+b^4+c^4=d^4,$$

and developed a construction yielding further solutions. Roger Frye later found the smallest such solution:

$$95800^4+217519^4+414560^4=422481^4.$$

These quartic identities have four terms in total and therefore lie on, rather than below, the boundary predicted by the LPS conjecture.

== Elementary cases ==
The conjecture is true for $k\leq4$.

For $k=2$, both sides must contain at least one term, so an equation with fewer than two terms is impossible. For $k=3$, an equation with fewer than three terms would have one term on each side; positivity would then force the two bases to be equal, contrary to the nontriviality condition.

For $k=4$, after exchanging the sides if necessary, the only possible nontrivial type with fewer than four terms is $(4,1,2)$. This would give an equation

$$a^4=b^4+c^4,$$

which is impossible by Fermat's Last Theorem. Consequently, the first unresolved exponent is $k=5$.

For $k=5$, Fermat's Last Theorem rules out equations of type $(5,1,2)$. Thus the possible counterexample types at this exponent are

$$(5,1,3)\quad\text{and}\quad(5,2,2).$$

Neither is known to have a solution in positive integers.

== Solutions on the conjectured boundary ==
Numerous solutions are known with $m+n=k$. Selected primitive examples are:

Selected equalities of type $(k,m,n)$ with $m+n=k$
| Type | Identity |
|---|---|
| $(4,2,2)$ | $59^4+158^4=133^4+134^4$ |
| $(4,1,3)$ | $422481^4=95800^4+217519^4+414560^4$ |
| $(5,1,4)$ | $144^5=27^5+84^5+110^5+133^5$ |
| $(5,2,3)$ | $14132^5+220^5=14068^5+6237^5+5027^5$ |
| $(6,3,3)$ | $3^6+19^6+22^6=10^6+15^6+23^6$ |

These examples show that the conjectured inequality, if true, is sharp: $m+n\geq k$ cannot be replaced by the stronger inequality $m+n>k$.

Boundary solutions do not constitute progress toward a counterexample. A counterexample must have strictly fewer than $k$ terms after all common terms have been cancelled.

== Known solutions with one term on a side ==
An interpretation of Plato's number is a solution for $k=3$

In the special case $m=1$, a solution is a partition of a $k$th power into $n$ like powers. Some known solutions meeting the proposed constraint $n\leq k$ are:

Selected solutions of type $(k,1,n)$
| $k$ | Solution | Attribution |
|---|---|---|
| 3 | $3^3+4^3+5^3=6^3$ | |
| 4 | $95800^4+217519^4+414560^4=422481^4$ | Roger Frye, 1988 |
| 4 | $30^4+120^4+272^4+315^4=353^4$ | R. Norrie, 1911 |
| 5 | $27^5+84^5+110^5+133^5=144^5$ | Lander and Parkin, 1966 |
| 5 | $7^5+43^5+57^5+80^5+100^5=107^5$ | Sastry, 1934 (third smallest) |
| 6 | (none known) | Resta and Meyrignac reported in 2003 that any solution must have lone base greater than 730000. |
| 7 | $127^7+258^7+266^7+413^7+430^7+439^7+525^7=568^7$ | M. Dodrill, 1999 |
| 8 | $90^8+223^8+478^8+524^8+748^8+1088^8+1190^8+1324^8=1409^8$ | Scott Chase, 2000 |
| $\geq9$ | (none known) | |

== Current status and partial results ==
No counterexample to the LPS conjecture is known. The equation

$$a^5+b^5=c^5+d^5$$

is the smallest-exponent two-versus-two case that the conjecture predicts to be impossible. It remains unknown whether it has a nontrivial solution in positive integers.

Several results show that solutions to related equations are sparse without proving their complete nonexistence. For fixed $k\geq5$, Timothy Browning obtained upper bounds for the number of integers up to a given height that have more than one essentially distinct coprime representation as a sum of two $k$th powers. Such density estimates are consistent with the conjecture but do not rule out isolated solutions.

Browning later proved analogous paucity results for equations

$$f(x_1)+f(x_2)=f(x_3)+f(x_4)$$

involving broad classes of higher-degree polynomials.

The conjecture also has consequences outside the direct study of equal sums. Kiss and Sándor observed that it would imply a density conjecture for generalized Sidon sets $B_h[g]$ built from perfect $k$th powers, in the range $h<k/2$, where $h$ denotes the number of summands allowed.

The conjecture has also been adopted as a working hypothesis in related problems. Assuming the special case that no two sums of twelve distinct $k$th powers are equal when $k\geq25$, Croot and Yip derived an upper bound on the size of Diophantine tuples with property $D_k(n)$ that is absolute, and in particular independent of $n$. That conditional bound has been carried into subsequent work on bipartite Diophantine tuples.

Computational searches and algebraic constructions have produced many solutions of types satisfying $m+n\geq k$. They provide evidence about which boundary and above-boundary types are solvable, but a finite search cannot establish the LPS lower bound for arbitrary integers.

== See also ==
- Beal conjecture
- Euler's sum of powers conjecture
- Experimental mathematics
- Fermat–Catalan conjecture
- Fermat's Last Theorem
- Generalized taxicab number
- Jacobi–Madden equation
- List of unsolved problems in mathematics
- Prouhet–Tarry–Escott problem
- Pythagorean quadruple
- Sums of powers
- Waring's problem
