= Diophantine =

Diophantine means pertaining to the ancient Greek mathematician Diophantus. A number of concepts bear this name:

- Diophantine approximation
- Diophantine equation
- Diophantine quintuple
- Diophantine set
