= Euler's conjecture =

The mathematician Leonhard Euler (1707–1783) made several different conjectures which are all called Euler's conjecture:

- Euler's sum of powers conjecture
- Euler's conjecture (Waring's problem)
- Euler's Graeco-Latin square conjecture
