= Francesco Galigai =

Italian mathematician (1498–1537)

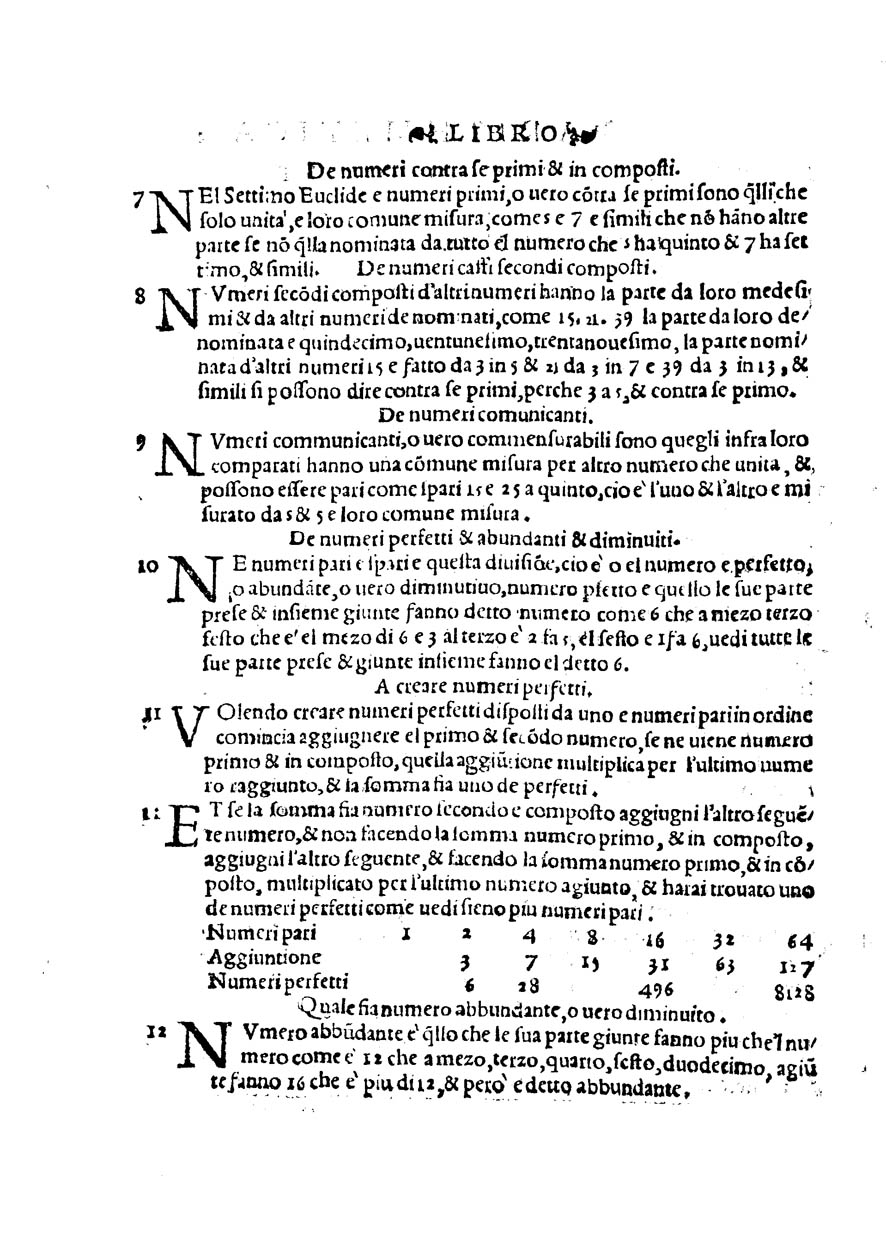
Pratica d'arithmetica (1552)

Francesco Galigai, or Ghaligai (Florence, 1498 – 1537), was an Italian mathematician.

In 1521, he published Summa de arithmetica, a summary of contemporary knowledge on equations of the first and second degree, including problems in indeterminate analysis, along with notes on the history and development of mathematics in Italy.

== Works ==
- Summa de arithmetica (in Italian). Florence: Bernardo Zucchetta. 1521.
- Pratica d'arithmetica (in Italian). Florence: eredi Bernardo Giunta. 1552.
