= Jacobi–Madden equation =

Quartic diophantine equation in 4 variables

The Jacobi–Madden equation is the Diophantine equation

$$a^4 + b^4 + c^4 + d^4 = (a + b + c + d)^4 ,$$

proposed by the physicist Lee W. Jacobi and the mathematician Daniel J. Madden in 2008. The variables a, b, c, and d can be any integers, positive, negative or 0. (Note: In fact, any nontrivial solution must include both a positive and negative value.) Jacobi and Madden showed that there are an infinitude of solutions of this equation with all variables non-zero.

== History ==
The Jacobi–Madden equation represents a particular case of the equation

$$a^4 + b^4 +c^4 +d^4 = e^4 ,$$

first proposed in 1772 by Leonhard Euler who conjectured that four is the minimum number (greater than one) of fourth powers of non-zero integers that can sum up to another fourth power. This conjecture, now known as Euler's sum of powers conjecture, was a natural generalization of the Fermat's Last Theorem, the latter having been proved for the fourth power by Pierre de Fermat himself.

Noam Elkies was first to find an infinite series of solutions to Euler's equation with exactly one variable equal to zero, thus disproving Euler's sum of powers conjecture for the fourth power.

However, until Jacobi and Madden's publication, it was not known whether there exist infinitely many solutions to Euler's equation with all variables non-zero. Only a finite number of such solutions was known. One of these solutions, discovered by Simcha Brudno in 1964, yielded a solution to the Jacobi–Madden equation:

$$5400^4 + 1770^4 + (-2634)^4 + 955^4 = (5400 + 1770 - 2634 + 955)^4.$$

== Approach ==
Jacobi and Madden started with,

$$a^4+b^4+c^4+d^4 = (a+b+c+d)^4$$

and the identity,

$$a^4+b^4+(a+b)^4 = 2(a^2+ab+b^2)^2$$

Adding $(a+b)^4+(c+d)^4$ to both sides of the equation,

$$a^4+b^4+(a+b)^4+c^4+d^4+(c+d)^4 = (a+b)^4+(c+d)^4+(a+b+c+d)^4$$

it can be seen it is a special Pythagorean triple,

$$(a^2+ab+b^2)^2+(c^2+cd+d^2)^2 = \big((a+b)^2+(a+b)(c+d)+(c+d)^2\big)^2 = \tfrac{1}{4}\big((a+b)^2+(c+d)^2+(a+b+c+d)^2\big)^2$$

They then used Brudno's solution and a certain elliptic curve to construct an infinite series of solutions to the Jacobi–Madden equation.

== Other initial solutions ==
Jacobi and Madden noticed that a different starting value, such as

$$(-31764)^4 + 27385^4 + 48150^4 + 7590^4 = (-31764 + 27385 + 48150 + 7590)^4 \,$$

found by Jaroslaw Wroblewski, would result in a different infinite series of solutions.

In August 2015, Seiji Tomita announced two new small solutions to the Jacobi–Madden equation:

$$1229559^4 + (-1022230)^4 + 1984340^4 + (-107110)^4 = (1229559 -1022230 + 1984340 - 107110)^4 \,,$$
$$561760^4 + 1493309^4 + 3597130^4 + (-1953890)^4 = (561760 + 1493309 + 3597130 - 1953890)^4 \,,$$

which lead to two new series of solutions constructed by the Jacobi and Madden method.

== See also ==
- Beal's conjecture – Conjecture in number theory
- Prouhet–Tarry–Escott problem – Unsolved problem about sums of powers
- Taxicab number – Class of integer
- Pythagorean quadruple – Four integers where the sum of the squares of three equals the square of the fourth
- Lander, Parkin, and Selfridge conjecture – Unsolved conjecture on equal sums of like powers
- Sums of powers – List of mathematical contexts in which exponentiated terms are summed
