= Sums of powers =

List of mathematical contexts in which exponentiated terms are summed

In mathematics and statistics, sums of powers occur in a number of contexts:

- Sums of squares arise in many contexts. For example, in geometry, the Pythagorean theorem involves the sum of two squares; in number theory, there are Legendre's three-square theorem and Jacobi's four-square theorem; and in statistics, the analysis of variance involves summing the squares of quantities.
- There are only finitely many positive integers that are not sums of distinct squares. The largest one is 128. The same applies for sums of distinct cubes (largest one is 12,758), distinct fourth powers (largest is 5,134,240), etc. See for a generalization to sums of polynomials.
- Faulhaber's formula expresses $1^k + 2^k + 3^k + \cdots + n^k$ as a polynomial in n, or alternatively in terms of a Bernoulli polynomial.
- The triangular numbers are the sums of the first powers of the first several positive integers. The squares of the triangular numbers are the sums of the third powers of the first several positive integers. In formulas, these are

$$1^1 + 2^1 + 3^1 + \cdots + n^1 = \frac{n(n+1)}{2}$$

and

$$1^3 + 2^3 + 3^3 + \cdots + n^3 = \left(\frac{n(n+1)}{2}\right)^2.$$

- Fermat's right triangle theorem states that there is no solution in positive integers for $a^2=b^4+c^4$ and $a^4=b^4+c^2$.
- Fermat's Last Theorem states that $x^k+y^k=z^k$ is impossible in positive integers with k > 2.
- The equation of a superellipse is $|x/a|^k+|y/b|^k=1$. The squircle is the case k = 4, a = b.
- Euler's sum of powers conjecture (disproved) concerns situations in which the sum of n integers, each a k^{th} power of an integer, equals another k^{th} power.
- The Fermat-Catalan conjecture asks whether there are an infinitude of examples in which the sum of two coprime integers, each a power of an integer, with the powers not necessarily equal, can equal another integer that is a power, with the reciprocals of the three powers summing to less than 1.
- Beal's conjecture concerns the question of whether the sum of two coprime integers, each a power greater than 2 of an integer, with the powers not necessarily equal, can equal another integer that is a power greater than 2.
- The Jacobi–Madden equation is $a^4 + b^4 + c^4 + d^4 = (a + b + c + d)^4$ in integers.
- The Prouhet–Tarry–Escott problem considers sums of two sets of k^{th} powers of integers that are equal for multiple values of k.
- A taxicab number is the smallest integer that can be expressed as a sum of two positive third powers in n distinct ways.
- The Riemann zeta function is the sum of reciprocals of the positive integers each raised to the power s, where s is a complex number whose real part is greater than 1.
- The Lander, Parkin, and Selfridge conjecture concerns the minimal value of m + n in $\sum_{i=1}^{n} a_i^k = \sum_{j=1}^{m} b_j^k.$
- Waring's problem asks whether for every natural number k there exists an associated positive integer s such that every natural number is the sum of at most s k^{th} powers of natural numbers.
- The successive powers of the golden ratio φ obey the Fibonacci recurrence:
  $$\varphi^{n+1} = \varphi^n + \varphi^{n-1}.$$
- Newton's identities express the sum of the k^{th} powers of all the roots of a polynomial in terms of the coefficients in the polynomial.
- The sum of cubes of numbers in arithmetic progression is sometimes another cube.
- The Fermat cubic, in which the sum of three cubes equals another cube, has a general solution.
- The power sum symmetric polynomial is a building block for symmetric polynomials.
- The sum of the reciprocals of all perfect powers including duplicates (but not including 1) equals 1.
- The Erdős–Moser equation, $1^k+2^k+\cdots+m^k=(m+1)^k$ where m and k are positive integers, is conjectured to have no solutions other than 1^{1} + 2^{1} = 3^{1}.
- The sums of three cubes cannot equal 4 or 5 modulo 9, but it is unknown whether all remaining integers can be expressed in this form.
- The sum of the terms in the geometric series is $\sum_{i=k}^{n} z^i = \frac{z^{k}-z^{n+1}}{1-z}.$
- The sum of powers can be expressed as such : $\sum_{i=1}^{n} i^k = \sum_{i=1}^{n}\sum_{j=i}^{n} j^{k-a}(i^a-(i-1)^a)$ for n greater than 1, a greater than 1 and all k. This one is useful to help determine subsequent sums of power based on known previous sums of power.

== See also ==
- Sum of squares
- Sum of reciprocals
- Diophantine equation
