= Andrej Dujella =

Croatian mathematician

Andrej Dujella (born May 21, 1966 in Pula) is a Croatian professor of mathematics at the University of Zagreb and a fellow of the Croatian Academy of Sciences and Arts.

== Life ==
Born in Pula, a native of Zadar, Dujella took part in the International Mathematical Olympiad, where he won a bronze medal in 1984. He received his M.Sc. and Ph.D. in mathematics from the University of Zagreb with a dissertation titled "Generalized Diophantine–Davenport problem". His main area of research is number theory, in particular Diophantine equations, elliptic curves, and applications of number theory in cryptography. Dujella is author of the monograph Number Theory (translated from Croatian). Dujella presently serves as the editor-in-chief of Rad-HAZU (Mathematical Section), a mathematics journal published by the Croatian Academy of Sciences and Arts (HAZU).

Dujella's main contribution to number theory is in connection to Diophantine m-tuples. Dujella has shown that there exists no Diophantine 6-tuple and that there exist at most a finite number of Diophantine 5-tuples. He applied Diophantine tuples to construct elliptic curves with high rank. In 1998, Dujella and Attila Pethő introduced congruence method to obtain lower bound for number of Diophantine 5-tuples.

In 2017, Dujella received an honorary doctorate from the University of Debrecen.

== Works ==
- Dujella, Andrej (2021). Number Theory. Translated by Petra Švob. Zagreb: Školska knjiga. ISBN 978-953-0-30897-8.
- Dujella, Andrej (2024). Diophantine m-tuples and Elliptic Curves. Developments in Mathematics. Vol. 79. Springer. doi:10.1007/978-3-031-56724-7. ISBN 978-3-031-56723-0.
