= Apollonian sphere packing =

3D fractal composed of tangential spheres

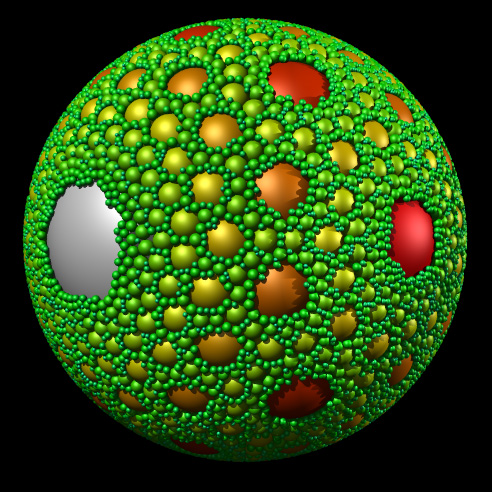
Apollonian sphere packing

Apollonian sphere packing is the three-dimensional equivalent of the Apollonian gasket. The principle of construction is very similar: with any four spheres that are cotangent to each other, it is then possible to construct two more spheres that are cotangent to four of them, resulting in an infinite sphere packing.

The fractal dimension is approximately 2.473946 (±1 in the last digit).

ApolFrac is software for generating and visualization of Apollonian sphere packing.
