= Prouhet–Tarry–Escott problem =

Unsolved problem about sums of powers

In mathematics, the Prouhet–Tarry–Escott problem asks for two disjoint multisets A and B of n integers each, whose first k power sum symmetric polynomials are all equal. That is, the two multisets should satisfy the equations

$$\sum_{a\in A} a^i = \sum_{b\in B} b^i$$

for each integer i from 1 to a given k. It has been shown that n must be strictly greater than k. Solutions with $k = n - 1$ are called ideal solutions. Ideal solutions are known for $3 \le n \le 10$ and for $n = 12$. No ideal solution is known for $n=11$ or for $n \ge 13$.

This problem was named after Eugène Prouhet, who studied it in the early 1850s, and Gaston Tarry and Edward B. Escott, who studied it in the early 1910s. The problem originates from letters of Christian Goldbach and Leonhard Euler (1750/1751).

== Examples ==
=== Ideal solutions ===
An ideal solution for n = 6 is given by the two sets { 0, 5, 6, 16, 17, 22 } and { 1, 2, 10, 12, 20, 21 }, because:

0^{1} + 5^{1} + 6^{1} + 16^{1} + 17^{1} + 22^{1} = 1^{1} + 2^{1} + 10^{1} + 12^{1} + 20^{1} + 21^{1}

0^{2} + 5^{2} + 6^{2} + 16^{2} + 17^{2} + 22^{2} = 1^{2} + 2^{2} + 10^{2} + 12^{2} + 20^{2} + 21^{2}

0^{3} + 5^{3} + 6^{3} + 16^{3} + 17^{3} + 22^{3} = 1^{3} + 2^{3} + 10^{3} + 12^{3} + 20^{3} + 21^{3}

0^{4} + 5^{4} + 6^{4} + 16^{4} + 17^{4} + 22^{4} = 1^{4} + 2^{4} + 10^{4} + 12^{4} + 20^{4} + 21^{4}

0^{5} + 5^{5} + 6^{5} + 16^{5} + 17^{5} + 22^{5} = 1^{5} + 2^{5} + 10^{5} + 12^{5} + 20^{5} + 21^{5}.

For n = 12, an ideal solution is given by A = {±22, ±61, ±86, ±127, ±140, ±151} and B = {±35, ±47, ±94, ±121, ±146, ±148}.

=== Other solutions ===
Prouhet used the Thue–Morse sequence to construct a solution with $n=2^k$ for any $k$. Namely, partition the numbers from 0 to $2^{k+1}-1$ into a) the numbers each with an even number of ones in its binary expansion and b) the numbers each with an odd number of ones in its binary expansion; then the two sets of the partition give a solution to the problem. For instance, for $n=8$ and $k=3$, Prouhet's solution is:

0^{1} + 3^{1} + 5^{1} + 6^{1} + 9^{1} + 10^{1} + 12^{1} + 15^{1} = 1^{1} + 2^{1} + 4^{1} + 7^{1} + 8^{1} + 11^{1} + 13^{1} + 14^{1}
0^{2} + 3^{2} + 5^{2} + 6^{2} + 9^{2} + 10^{2} + 12^{2} + 15^{2} = 1^{2} + 2^{2} + 4^{2} + 7^{2} + 8^{2} + 11^{2} + 13^{2} + 14^{2}
0^{3} + 3^{3} + 5^{3} + 6^{3} + 9^{3} + 10^{3} + 12^{3} + 15^{3} = 1^{3} + 2^{3} + 4^{3} + 7^{3} + 8^{3} + 11^{3} + 13^{3} + 14^{3}.

== Generalizations ==
A higher-dimensional version of the Prouhet–Tarry–Escott problem has been introduced and studied by Andreas Alpers and Robert Tijdeman in 2007: Given parameters $n,k \in \mathbb{N}$, find two different multi-sets $\{(x_1,y_1),\dots,(x_n,y_n)\}$, $\{(x_1',y_1'),\dots,(x_n',y_n') \}$ of points from $\mathbb{Z}^2$ such that

$$\sum_{i=1}^nx_i^jy_i^{d-j}=\sum_{i=1}^n{x'}_i^j{y'}_i^{d-j}$$

for all $d,j \in \{0,\dots,k\}$ with $j \leq d.$ This problem is related to discrete tomography and also leads to special Prouhet-Tarry-Escott solutions over the Gaussian integers (though solutions to the Alpers-Tijdeman problem do not exhaust the Gaussian integer solutions to Prouhet-Tarry-Escott).

A solution for $n=6$ and $k=5$ is given, for instance, by:

$\{(x_1,y_1),\dots,(x_6,y_6)\}=\{(2,1),(1,3),(3,6),(6,7),(7,5),(5,2)\}$ and

$$\{(x'_1,y'_1),\dots,(x'_6,y'_6)\}=\{(1,2),(2,5),(5,7),(7,6),(6,3),(3,1)\}$$.

No solutions for $n=k+1$ with $k\geq6$ are known.

== See also ==
- Euler's sum of powers conjecture
- Beal's conjecture
- Jacobi–Madden equation
- Lander, Parkin, and Selfridge conjecture
- Taxicab number
- Pythagorean quadruple
- Sums of powers, a list of related conjectures and theorems
- Discrete tomography
