= Minimal counterexample =

Smallest example which falsifies a claim

In mathematics, a minimal counterexample is the smallest example which falsifies a claim. It is also sometimes called a minimal criminal, smallest criminal, or least criminal, especially (but not exclusively) in the context of the four-color theorem. A proof by minimal counterexample (or by minimal/smallest/least criminal) is a method of proof which combines the use of a minimal counterexample with the methods of proof by induction and proof by contradiction. More specifically, in trying to prove a proposition P, one first assumes by contradiction that it is false, and that therefore there must be at least one counterexample. With respect to some idea of size (which may need to be chosen carefully), one then concludes that there is such a counterexample C that is minimal. In regard to the argument, C is generally something quite hypothetical (since the truth of P excludes the possibility of C), but it may be possible to argue that if C existed, then it would have some definite properties which, after applying some reasoning similar to that in an inductive proof, would lead to a contradiction, thereby showing that the proposition P is indeed true.

If the form of the contradiction is that we can derive a further counterexample D, that is smaller than C in the sense of the working hypothesis of minimality, then this technique is traditionally called proof by infinite descent. In which case, there may be multiple and more complex ways to structure the argument of the proof.

The assumption that if there is a counterexample, there is a minimal counterexample, is based on a well-ordering of some kind. The usual ordering on the natural numbers is clearly possible, by the most usual formulation of mathematical induction; but the scope of the method can include well-ordered induction of any kind.

== Examples ==
The minimal counterexample method has been much used in the classification of finite simple groups. The Feit–Thompson theorem, that finite simple groups that are not cyclic groups have even order, was proved based on the hypothesis of some, and therefore some minimal, simple group G of odd order. Every proper subgroup of G can be assumed a solvable group, meaning that much theory of such subgroups could be applied.

Euclid's proof of the fundamental theorem of arithmetic is a simple proof which uses a minimal counterexample.

A minimal counterexample has often been used in proofs of the four-color theorem, where it is usually called a minimal criminal.
