= Beal conjecture =

Conjecture in number theory

The Beal conjecture is the following conjecture in number theory:

Unsolved problem in mathematics
If $A^x + B^y = C^z$ where A, B, C, x, y, z are positive integers and x, y, z are > 2, do A, B, and C have a common prime factor?
More unsolved problems in mathematics

If

$$A^x +B^y = C^z$$,

where A, B, C, x, y, and z are positive integers with x, y, z > 2, then A, B, and C have a common prime factor.

Equivalently,

The equation $A^x + B^y = C^z$ has no solutions in positive integers and pairwise coprime integers A, B, C if x, y, z > 2.

The conjecture was formulated in 1993 by Andrew Beal, a banker and amateur mathematician, while investigating generalizations of Fermat's Last Theorem. Since 1997, Beal has offered a monetary prize for a peer-reviewed proof of this conjecture or a counterexample. The value of the prize has increased several times and is currently $1 million.

In some publications, this conjecture has occasionally been referred to as a generalized Fermat equation, the Mauldin conjecture, and the Tijdeman-Zagier conjecture.

== Related examples ==
To illustrate, the solution $3^3 + 6^3 = 3^5$ has bases with a common factor of 3, the solution $7^3 + 7^4 = 14^3$ has bases with a common factor of 7, and $2^n + 2^n = 2^{n+1}$ has bases with a common factor of 2. Indeed the equation has infinitely many solutions where the bases share a common factor, including generalizations of the above three examples, respectively

$$3^{3n}+[2(3^{n})]^{3}=3^{3n+2}, \quad\quad n \ge 1;$$

$$[b(a^{n}-b^{n})^{k}]^{n}+(a^{n}-b^{n})^{kn+1}=[a(a^{n}-b^{n})^{k}]^{n}, \quad\quad a > b, \quad b \ge 1, \quad k \ge 1, \quad n \ge 3;$$

and

$$[a(a^{n}+b^{n})^{k}]^{n}+[b(a^{n}+b^{n})^{k}]^{n}=(a^{n}+b^{n})^{kn+1}, \quad \quad a \ge 1, \quad b \ge 1, \quad k \ge 1, \quad n \ge 3.$$

Furthermore, for each solution (with or without coprime bases), there are infinitely many solutions with the same set of exponents and an increasing set of non-coprime bases. That is, for solution

$$A_1^{x} + B_1^{y} = C_1^{z}$$

we additionally have

$A_n^{x}+B_n^{y} = C_n^{z};$ $n \ge 2$

where

$$A_{n} = (A_{n-1}^{yz+1}) (B_{n-1}^{yz  }) (C_{n-1}^{yz  })$$
$$B_{n} = (A_{n-1}^{xz  }) (B_{n-1}^{xz+1}) (C_{n-1}^{xz  })$$
$$C_{n} = (A_{n-1}^{xy  }) (B_{n-1}^{xy  }) (C_{n-1}^{xy+1})$$

Any solutions to the Beal conjecture will necessarily involve three terms all of which are 3-powerful numbers, i.e. numbers where the exponent of every prime factor is at least three. It is known that there are an infinite number of such sums involving coprime 3-powerful numbers; however, such sums are rare. The smallest two examples are:

$$\begin{align}
271^3 + 2^3\ 3^5\ 73^3 = 919^3 &= 776{,}151{,}559 \\
3^4\ 29^3\ 89^3 + 7^3\ 11^3\ 167^3 = 2^7\ 5^4\ 353^3 &= 3{,}518{,}958{,}160{,}000 \\
\end{align}$$

What distinguishes Beal's conjecture is that it requires each of the three terms to be expressible as a single power.

== Relation to other conjectures ==
Fermat's Last Theorem established that $A^n + B^n = C^n$ has no solutions for n > 2 for positive integers A, B, and C. If any solutions had existed to Fermat's Last Theorem, then by dividing out every common factor, there would also exist solutions with A, B, and C coprime. Hence, Fermat's Last Theorem can be seen as a special case of the Beal conjecture restricted to x = y = z.

The Fermat–Catalan conjecture is that $A^x +B^y = C^z$ has only finitely many solutions with A, B, and C being positive integers with no common prime factor and x, y, and z being positive integers satisfying $\frac{1}{x}+\frac{1}{y}+\frac{1}{z} < 1$. Beal's conjecture can be restated as "All Fermat–Catalan conjecture solutions will use 2 as an exponent".

The abc conjecture would imply that there are at most finitely many counterexamples to Beal's conjecture.

== Partial results ==
In the cases below where n is an exponent, multiples of n are also proven, since a kn-th power is also an n-th power. Where solutions involving a second power are alluded to below, they can be found specifically at Fermat–Catalan conjecture § Known solutions. All cases of the form (2, 3, n) or (2, n, 3) have the solution 2^{3} + 1^{n} = 3^{2} which is referred below as the Catalan solution.

- The case x = y = z ≥ 3 is Fermat's Last Theorem, proven to have no solutions by Andrew Wiles in 1994.
- The case (x, y, z) = (2, 3, 7) and all its permutations were proven to have only four non-Catalan solutions, none of them contradicting Beal conjecture, by Bjorn Poonen, Edward F. Schaefer, and Michael Stoll in 2005.
- The case (x, y, z) = (2, 3, 8) and all its permutations were proven to have only two non-Catalan solutions, neither of which contradicts Beal conjecture, by Nils Bruin in 2003.
- The case (x, y, z) = (2, 3, 9) and all its permutations are known to have only one non-Catalan solution, which doesn't contradict Beal conjecture, by Nils Bruin in 2003.
- The case (x, y, z) = (2, 3, 10) and all its permutations were proven by David Zureick-Brown in 2009 to have only the Catalan solution.
- The case (x, y, z) = (2, 3, 11) and all its permutations were proven by Freitas, Naskręcki and Stoll to have only the Catalan solution.
- The case (x, y, z) = (2, 3, 15) and all its permutations were proven by Samir Siksek and Michael Stoll in 2013 to have only the Catalan solution.
- The case (x, y, z) = (2, 4, 4) and all its permutations were proven to have no solutions by combined work of Pierre de Fermat in the 1640s and Euler in 1738. (See one proof here and another here)
- The case (x, y, z) = (2, 4, 5) and all its permutations are known to have only two non-Catalan solutions, neither of which contradicts Beal conjecture, by Nils Bruin in 2003.
- The case (x, y, z) = (2, 4, n) and all its permutations were proven for n ≥ 6 by Michael Bennett, Jordan Ellenberg, and Nathan Ng in 2009.
- The case (x, y, z) = (2, 6, n) and all its permutations were proven for n ≥ 3 by Michael Bennett and Imin Chen in 2011 and by Bennett, Chen, Dahmen and Yazdani in 2014.
- The case (x, y, z) = (2, 2n, 3) was proven for 3 ≤ n ≤ 10^{7} except n = 7 and various modulo congruences when n is prime to have no non-Catalan solution by Bennett, Chen, Dahmen and Yazdani.
- The cases (x, y, z) = (2, 2n, 9), (2, 2n, 10), (2, 2n, 15) and all their permutations were proven for n ≥ 2 by Bennett, Chen, Dahmen and Yazdani in 2014.
- The case (x, y, z) = (3, 3, n) and all its permutations have been proven for 3 ≤ n ≤ 10^{9} and various modulo congruences when n is prime.
- The case (x, y, z) = (3, 4, 5) and all its permutations were proven by Siksek and Stoll in 2011.
- The case (x, y, z) = (3, 5, 5) and all its permutations were proven by Bjorn Poonen in 1998.
- The case (x, y, z) = (3, 6, n) and all its permutations were proven for n ≥ 3 by Bennett, Chen, Dahmen and Yazdani in 2014.
- The case (x, y, z) = (2n, 3, 4) and all its permutations were proven for n ≥ 2 by Bennett, Chen, Dahmen and Yazdani in 2014.
- The cases (x, y, z) = (5, 5, 7), (5, 5, 19), (7, 7, 5) and all their permutations were proven by Sander R. Dahmen and Samir Siksek in 2013.
- The cases (x, y, z) = (n, n, 2) and all its permutations were proven for n ≥ 4 by Darmon and Merel in 1995 following work from Euler and Poonen.
- The cases (x, y, z) = (n, n, 3) and all its permutations were proven for n ≥ 3 by Édouard Lucas, Bjorn Poonen, and Darmon and Merel.
- The case (x, y, z) = (2n, 2n, 5) and all its permutations were proven for n ≥ 2 by Bennett in 2006.
- The case (x, y, z) = (2l, 2m, n) and all its permutations were proven for l, m ≥ 5 primes and n = 3, 5, 7, 11 by Anni and Siksek.
- The case (x, y, z) = (2l, 2m, 13) and all its permutations were proven for l, m ≥ 5 primes by Billerey, Chen, Dembélé, Dieulefait, Freitas.
- The case (x, y, z) = (3l, 3m, n) is direct for l, m ≥ 2 and n ≥ 3 from work by Kraus.
- The Darmon–Granville theorem uses Faltings' theorem to show that for every specific choice of exponents (x, y, z), there are at most finitely many coprime solutions for (A, B, C).
- The impossibility of the case A = 1 or B = 1 is implied by Catalan's conjecture, proven in 2002 by Preda Mihăilescu. (Notice C cannot be 1, or one of A and B must be 0, which is not permitted.)
- A potential class of solutions to the equation, namely those with A, B, C also forming a Pythagorean triple, were considered by L. Jesmanowicz in the 1950s. J. Jozefiak proved that there are an infinite number of primitive Pythagorean triples that cannot satisfy the Beal equation. Further results are due to Chao Ko.
- Peter Norvig, Director of Research at Google, reported having conducted a series of numerical searches for counterexamples to Beal's conjecture. Among his results, he excluded all possible solutions having each of x, y, z ≤ 7 and each of A, B, C ≤ 250,000, as well as possible solutions having each of x, y, z ≤ 100 and each of A, B, C ≤ 10,000.
- If A, B are odd and x, y are even, Beal's conjecture has no counterexample.
- By assuming the validity of Beal's conjecture, there exists an upper bound for any common divisor of x, y and z in the expression $ax^m+by^n = z^r$.

== Prize ==
For a published proof or counterexample, banker Andrew Beal initially offered a prize of US $5,000 in 1997, raising it to $50,000 over ten years, but has since raised it to US $1,000,000.

The American Mathematical Society (AMS) holds the $1 million prize in a trust until the Beal conjecture is solved. It is supervised by the Beal Prize Committee (BPC), which is appointed by the AMS president.

== Variants ==
The counterexamples $3^5 + 10^2 = 7^3$, $7^3 + 13^2 = 2^9$, and $1^m + 2^3 = 3^2$ show that the conjecture would be false if one of the exponents were allowed to be 2. The Fermat–Catalan conjecture is an open conjecture dealing with such cases (the condition of this conjecture is that the sum of the reciprocals is less than 1). If we allow at most one of the exponents to be 2, then there may be only finitely many solutions (except the case $1^m + 2^3 = 3^2$).

A variation of the conjecture asserting that x, y, z (instead of A, B, C) must have a common prime factor is not true. A counterexample is $27^4 +162^3 = 9^7,$ in which 4, 3, and 7 have no common prime factor. (In fact, the maximum common prime factor of the exponents that is valid is 2; a common factor greater than 2 would be a counterexample to Fermat's Last Theorem.)

The conjecture is not valid over the larger domain of Gaussian integers. After a prize of $50 was offered for a counterexample, Fred W. Helenius provided $(-2+i)^3 + (-2-i)^3 = (1+i)^4$.

== See also ==
- ABC conjecture
- Euler's sum of powers conjecture
- Jacobi–Madden equation
- Prouhet–Tarry–Escott problem
- Taxicab number
- Pythagorean quadruple
- Sums of powers, a list of related conjectures and theorems
- Distributed computing
- BOINC
