= Plato's number =

Unspecified value mentioned by Plato

Plato's number is a number enigmatically referred to by Plato in his dialogue the Republic (8.546b). The text is notoriously difficult to understand and its corresponding translations do not allow an unambiguous interpretation. There is no real agreement either about the meaning or the value of the number. It also has been called the "geometrical number" or the "nuptial number" (the "number of the bride"). The passage in which Plato introduced the number has been discussed ever since it was written, with no consensus in the debate. As for the number's actual value, 216 is the most frequently proposed value for it, but 3,600 or 12,960,000 are also commonly considered.

An incomplete list of authors who mention or discourse about the number includes the names of Aristotle, Proclus for antiquity; Ficino and Cardano during the Renaissance; Zeller, Friedrich Schleiermacher, Paul Tannery and Friedrich Hultsch in the 19th century and further new names are currently added.

Further in the Republic (9.587b) another number is mentioned, known as the "Number of the Tyrant".

== Plato's text ==
Great lexical and syntactical differences are easily noted between the many translations of the Republic. Below is a typical text from a respected 1937 translation of Republic 546b–c:

Now for divine begettings there is a period comprehended by a perfect number, and for mortal by the first in which augmentations dominating and dominated when they have attained to three distances and four limits of the assimilating and the dissimilating, the waxing and the waning, render all things conversable and commensurable [546c] with one another, whereof a basal four-thirds wedded to the pempad yields two harmonies at the third augmentation, the one the product of equal factors taken one hundred times, the other of equal length one way but oblong,-one dimension of a hundred numbers determined by the rational diameters of the pempad lacking one in each case, or of the irrational lacking two; the other dimension of a hundred cubes of the triad. And this entire geometrical number is determinative of this thing, of better and inferior births.

The 'entire geometrical number', mentioned shortly before the end of this text, is understood to be Plato's number. The introductory words mention (a period comprehended by) 'a perfect number' which is taken to be a reference to Plato's perfect year mentioned in his Timaeus (39d). The words are presented as uttered by the muses, so the whole passage is sometimes called the 'speech of the muses' or something similar. Indeed, Philip Melanchthon compared it to the proverbial obscurity of the Sibyls. Cicero famously described it as 'obscure' but others have seen some playfulness in its tone.

== Interpretations ==
An illustrated interpretation of Plato's number as 3³ + 4³ + 5³ = 6³

Shortly after Plato's time his meaning apparently did not cause puzzlement as Aristotle's casual remark attests. Half a millennium later, however, it was an enigma for the Neoplatonists, who had a somewhat mystic penchant and wrote frequently about it, proposing geometrical and numerical interpretations. Next, for nearly a thousand years, Plato's texts disappeared from Western Europe and it is only in the Renaissance that the enigma briefly resurfaced. During the 19th century, when classical scholars restored original texts, the problem reappeared. Schleiermacher interrupted his edition of Plato for a decade while attempting to make sense of the paragraph. Victor Cousin inserted a note that it has to be skipped in his French translation of Plato's works. In the early 20th century, scholarly findings suggested a Babylonian origin for the topic.

Most interpreters argue that the value of Plato's number is 216 because it is the cube of 6, i.e. 6^{3} = 216, which is remarkable for also being the sum of the cubes for the Pythagorean triple (3, 4, 5): 3^{3} + 4^{3} + 5^{3} = 6^{3}.

Such considerations tend to ignore the second part of the text where some other numbers and their relations are described. The opinions tend to converge about their values being 480,000 and 270,000 but there is little agreement about the details. It has been noted that 6^{4} yields 1296 and 48 × 27 = 36 × 36 = 1296. Instead of multiplication some interpretations consider the sum of these factors: 48 + 27 = 75.

Other values that have been proposed include:

- 17,500 = 100 × 100 + 4800 + 2700, by Otto Weber (1862).
- 760,000 = 750,000 + 10,000 = 19 × 4 × 10000, 19 being obtained from (4/3 + 5) × 3 and being the number of years in the Metonic cycle.
- 8128 = 2^{6} × (2^{7} − 1), a perfect number proposed by Cardano. It is known that such numbers can be decomposed into the sum of consecutive odd cubes, so 8128 = 1^{3} + 3^{3} + 5^{3} + ... + 15^{3}.
- 1728 = 12^{3} = 8 × 12 × 18, by Marsilio Ficino (1496).
- 5040 = 144 × 35 = (3 + 4 + 5)^{2} × (2^{3} + 3^{3}), by Jacob Friedrich Fries (1823).

== See also ==
- Euler's sum of powers conjecture
