= Proof by infinite descent =

Mathematical proof technique using contradiction

In mathematics, a proof by infinite descent, also known as Fermat's method of descent, is a particular kind of proof by contradiction used to show that a statement cannot possibly hold for any number, by showing that if the statement were to hold for a number, then the same would be true for a smaller number, leading to an infinite descent and ultimately a contradiction. It is a method which relies on the well-ordering principle, and is often used to show that a given equation, such as a Diophantine equation, has no solutions.

Typically, one shows that if a solution to a problem existed, which in some sense was related to one or more natural numbers, it would necessarily imply that a second solution existed, which was related to one or more 'smaller' natural numbers. This in turn would imply a third solution related to smaller natural numbers, implying a fourth solution, therefore a fifth solution, and so on. However, there cannot be an infinity of ever-smaller natural numbers, and therefore by mathematical induction, the original premise—that any solution exists—is incorrect: its correctness produces a contradiction.

An alternative way to express this is to assume one or more solutions or examples exists, from which a smallest solution or example—a minimal counterexample—can then be inferred. Once there, one would try to prove that if a smallest solution exists, then it must imply the existence of a smaller solution (in some sense), which again proves that the existence of any solution would lead to a contradiction.

The earliest uses of the method of infinite descent appear in Euclid's Elements. A typical example is Proposition 31 of Book 7, in which Euclid proves that every composite integer is divided (in Euclid's terminology "measured") by some prime number.

The method was much later developed by Fermat, who coined the term and often used it for Diophantine equations. Two typical examples are showing the non-solvability of the Diophantine equation $r^2+s^4=t^4$ and proving Fermat's theorem on sums of two squares, which states that an odd prime p can be expressed as a sum of two squares when $p\equiv1\pmod{4}$ (see Modular arithmetic and proof by infinite descent). In this way Fermat was able to show the non-existence of solutions in many cases of Diophantine equations of classical interest (for example, the problem of four perfect squares in arithmetic progression).

In some cases, to the modern eye, his "method of infinite descent" is an exploitation of the inversion of the doubling function for rational points on an elliptic curve E. The context is of a hypothetical non-trivial rational point on E. Doubling a point on E roughly doubles the length of the numbers required to write it (as number of digits), so that "halving" a point gives a rational with smaller terms. Since the terms are positive, they cannot decrease forever.

== Number theory ==
In the number theory of the twentieth century, the infinite descent method was taken up again, and pushed to a point where it connected with the main thrust of algebraic number theory and the study of L-functions. The structural result of Mordell, that the rational points on an elliptic curve E form a finitely-generated abelian group, used an infinite descent argument based on E/2E in Fermat's style.

To extend this to the case of an abelian variety A, André Weil had to make more explicit the way of quantifying the size of a solution, by means of a height function – a concept that became foundational. To show that A(Q)/2A(Q) is finite, which is certainly a necessary condition for the finite generation of the group A(Q) of rational points of A, one must do calculations in what later was recognised as Galois cohomology. In this way, abstractly defined cohomology groups in the theory become identified with descents in the tradition of Fermat. The Mordell–Weil theorem was at the start of what later became a very extensive theory.

== Application examples ==
=== Irrationality of √2 ===
The proof that the square root of 2 (√2) is irrational (i.e. cannot be expressed as a fraction of two whole numbers) was discovered by the ancient Greeks, and is perhaps the earliest known example of a proof by infinite descent. Pythagoreans discovered that the diagonal of a square is incommensurable with its side, or in modern language, that the square root of two is irrational. Little is known with certainty about the time or circumstances of this discovery, but the name of Hippasus of Metapontum is often mentioned. For a while, the Pythagoreans treated as an official secret the discovery that the square root of two is irrational, and, according to legend, Hippasus was murdered for divulging it. The square root of two is occasionally called "Pythagoras' number" or "Pythagoras' Constant", for example Conway & Guy (1996).

The ancient Greeks, not having algebra, worked out a geometric proof by infinite descent (John Horton Conway presented another geometric proof by infinite descent that may be more accessible). The following is an algebraic proof along similar lines:

Suppose that √2 were rational. Then it could be written as

$$\sqrt{2} = \frac{p}{q}$$

for two natural numbers, p and q. Then squaring would give

$$2 = \frac{p^2}{q^2},$$
$$2q^2 = p^2,$$

so 2 must divide p^{2}. Because 2 is a prime number, it must also divide p, by Euclid's lemma. So p = 2r, for some integer r.

But then,

$$2q^2 = (2r)^2 = 4r^2,$$
$$q^2 = 2r^2,$$

which shows that 2 must divide q as well. So q = 2s for some integer s.

This gives

$$\frac{p}{q}=\frac{2r}{2s}=\frac{r}{s}$$.

Therefore, if √2 could be written as a rational number, then it could always be written as a rational number with smaller parts, which itself could be written with yet-smaller parts, ad infinitum. But this is impossible in the set of natural numbers. Since √2 is a real number, which can be either rational or irrational, the only option left is for √2 to be irrational.

(Alternatively, this proves that if √2 were rational, no "smallest" representation as a fraction could exist, as any attempt to find a "smallest" representation p/q would imply that a smaller one existed, which is a similar contradiction.)

=== Irrationality of √k if it is not an integer ===
For positive integer k, suppose that √k is not an integer, but is rational and can be expressed as m/n for natural numbers m and n, and let q be the largest integer less than √k (that is, q is the floor of √k). Then

$$\begin{align}
\sqrt k &=\frac mn\\
[6pt] &=\frac{m\left(\sqrt k-q\right)}{n\left(\sqrt k-q\right)}\\
[6pt] &=\frac{m\sqrt k-mq}{n\sqrt k-nq}\\
[6pt] &=\frac{\left(n \sqrt k\right)\sqrt k-mq}{n \left(\frac{m}{n}\right) -nq}\\
[6pt] &=\frac{nk-mq}{m-nq}
\end{align}$$

The numerator and denominator were each multiplied by the expression (√k − q)—which is positive but less than 1—and then simplified independently. So, the resulting products, say m′ and n′, are themselves integers, and are less than m and n respectively. Therefore, no matter what natural numbers m and n are used to express √k, there exist smaller natural numbers m′ < m and n′ < n that have the same ratio. But infinite descent on the natural numbers is impossible, so this disproves the original assumption that √k could be expressed as a ratio of natural numbers.

=== Non-solvability of r^{2} + s^{4} = t^{4} and its permutations ===
The non-solvability of $r^2 + s^4 =t^4$ in integers is sufficient to show the non-solvability of $q^4 + s^4 =t^4$ in integers, which is a special case of Fermat's Last Theorem, and the historical proofs of the latter proceeded by more broadly proving the former using infinite descent. The following more recent proof demonstrates both of these impossibilities by proving still more broadly that a Pythagorean triangle cannot have any two of its sides each either a square or twice a square, since there is no smallest such triangle:

Suppose there exists such a Pythagorean triangle. Then it can be scaled down to give a primitive (i.e., with no common factors other than 1) Pythagorean triangle with the same property. Primitive Pythagorean triangles' sides can be written as $x=2ab,$ $y=a^2-b^2,$ $z=a^2+b^2$, with a and b relatively prime and with a+b odd and hence y and z both odd. The property that y and z are each odd means that neither y nor z can be twice a square. Furthermore, if x is a square or twice a square, then each of a and b is a square or twice a square. There are three cases, depending on which two sides are postulated to each be a square or twice a square:

- y and z: In this case, y and z are both squares. But then the right triangle with legs $\sqrt{yz}$ and $b^2$ and hypotenuse $a^2$ also would have integer sides including a square leg ($b^2$) and a square hypotenuse ($a^2$), and would have a smaller hypotenuse ($a^2$ compared to $z=a^2+b^2$).
- z and x: z is a square. The integer right triangle with legs $a$ and $b$ and hypotenuse $\sqrt{z}$ also would have two sides ($a$ and $b$) each of which is a square or twice a square, and a smaller hypotenuse ($\sqrt{z}$ compared to $z$).
- y and x: y is a square. The integer right triangle with legs $b$ and $\sqrt{y}$ and hypotenuse $a$ would have two sides (b and a) each of which is a square or twice a square, with a smaller hypotenuse than the original triangle ($a$ compared to $z=a^2+b^2$).

In any of these cases, one Pythagorean triangle with two sides each of which is a square or twice a square has led to a smaller one, which in turn would lead to a smaller one, etc.; since such a sequence cannot go on infinitely, the original premise that such a triangle exists must be wrong.

This implies that the equations

$$r^2 + s^4 = t^4,$$
$r^4 + s^2 =t^4,$ and
$$r^4 + s^4 =t^2$$

cannot have non-trivial solutions, since non-trivial solutions would give Pythagorean triangles with two sides being squares.

For other similar proofs by infinite descent for the n = 4 case of Fermat's Theorem, see the articles by Grant and Perella and Barbara.

== See also ==
- Vieta jumping
