= Fermat–Catalan conjecture =

Generalization of Fermat's Last Theorem and of Catalan's conjecture,

In number theory, the Fermat–Catalan conjecture is a generalization of Fermat's Last Theorem and of Catalan's conjecture. The conjecture states that the equation

$a^m + b^n = c^k\quad$	1

has only finitely many solutions (a, b, c, m, n, k) with distinct triplets of values (a^{m}, b^{n}, c^{k}) where a, b, c are positive coprime integers and m, n, k are positive integers satisfying

$\frac{1}{m} + \frac{1}{n} + \frac{1}{k} < 1.$	2

The inequality on m, n, and k is a necessary part of the conjecture. Without the inequality there would be infinitely many solutions, for instance with k = 1 (for any a, b, m, and n and with c = a^{m} + b^{n}), with m=n=k=2 (for the infinitely many Pythagorean triples), and e.g. $7^5 + 393^3 = 7792^2$.

== Known solutions ==
As of 2024, the following ten solutions to equation (1) which meet the criteria of equation (2) are known:

$1^m + 2^3 = 3^2\;$ (for $m>6$ to satisfy Eq. 2)
$$2^5 + 7^2 = 3^4\;$$
$$7^3 + 13^2 = 2^9\;$$
$$2^7 + 17^3 = 71^2\;$$
$$3^5 + 11^4 = 122^2\;$$
$$33^8 + 1549034^2 = 15613^3\;$$
$$1414^3 + 2213459^2 = 65^7\;$$
$$9262^3 + 15312283^2 = 113^7\;$$
$$17^7 + 76271^3 = 21063928^2\;$$
$$43^8 + 96222^3 = 30042907^2\;$$

The first of these (1^{m} + 2^{3} = 3^{2}) is the only solution where one of a, b or c is 1, according to the Catalan conjecture, proven in 2002 by Preda Mihăilescu. While this case leads to infinitely many solutions of (1) (since one can pick any m for m > 6), these solutions only give a single triplet of values (a^{m}, b^{n}, c^{k}).

== Partial results ==
It is known by the Darmon–Granville theorem, which uses Faltings' theorem, that for any fixed choice of positive integers m, n and k satisfying (2), only finitely many coprime triples (a, b, c) solving (1) exist. However, the full Fermat–Catalan conjecture is stronger as it allows for the exponents m, n and k to vary.

The abc conjecture implies the Fermat–Catalan conjecture.

For a list of results for impossible combinations of exponents, see Beal conjecture#Partial results. Beal's conjecture is true if and only if all Fermat–Catalan solutions have m = 2, n = 2, or k = 2.

Poonen et al. list exponent triples where the solutions have been determined: (Note: The notation "{p,q,r}" means that the solutions have been determined for every permutation of (p,q,r).) {2,3,7}, {2,3,8}, {2,3,9}, {2,2q,3} for prime 7<q<1000 with q≠31, {2,4,5}, {2,4,6}, (2,4,7), (2,4,q) for prime q≥211, (2,n,4), {2,n,n}, {3,3,4}, {3,3,5}, {3,3,q} for 17≤q≤10000, {3,n,n}, {2n,2n,5}, {n,n,n}. For each of these exponent triples, if there is some solution at all, it is listed among those in section § Known solutions.

Sikora partially used the cluster computers at the Center for Computational Research at University at Buffalo to test all tuples (a,b,c,m,n,k) such that min(m,n,k) ≤ 113 and a^{m}, b^{n}, c^{k} < M_{min(m,n,k)}, where M_{2} = 2^{71}, M_{3} = 2^{80}, M_{4} = 2^{100}, and M_{5} = ... = M_{113} = 2^{113}. He did not find any other solution than those above. (Note: For example, the five known large solutions were all reproduced during the test for min(m,n,k) = 2, where a^{m}, b^{n}, and c^{k} were considered up to 2^{71}.)

== See also ==
- Sums of powers, a list of related conjectures and theorems
