= Diophantine quintuple =

Set of positive integers such that the product of any two plus one is a perfect square

In number theory, a diophantine m-tuple is a set of m positive integers $\{a_1, a_2, a_3, a_4,\ldots, a_m\}$ such that $a_i a_j + 1$ is a perfect square for any $1\le i < j \le m.$ A set of m positive rational numbers with the similar property that the product of any two is one less than a rational square is known as a rational diophantine m-tuple.

== Diophantine m-tuples ==
The first Diophantine quadruple was found by Fermat: $\{1,3, 8, 120\}.$ It was proved in 1969 by Baker and Davenport that a fifth positive integer cannot be added to this set. However, Euler was able to extend this set by adding the rational number $\tfrac{777480}{8288641}.$

The question of existence of (integer) Diophantine quintuples was one of the oldest outstanding unsolved problems in number theory. In 2004 Andrej Dujella showed that at most a finite number of Diophantine quintuples exist. In 2016 it was shown that no such quintuples exist by He, Togbé and Ziegler.

As Euler proved, every Diophantine pair can be extended to a Diophantine quadruple. The same is true for every Diophantine triple. In both of these types of extension, as for Fermat's quadruple, it is possible to add a fifth rational number rather than an integer.

== The rational case ==
Diophantus himself found the rational Diophantine quadruple $\left\{\tfrac1{16}, \tfrac{33}{16}, \tfrac{17}4, \tfrac{105}{16}\right\}.$ More recently, Philip Gibbs found sets of six positive rationals with the property. It is not known whether any larger rational Diophantine m-tuples exist or even if there is an upper bound, but it is known that no infinite set of rationals with the property exists.
