= Euler's sum of powers conjecture =

Disproved conjecture in number theory

In number theory, Euler's conjecture is a disproved conjecture related to Fermat's Last Theorem. It was presented by Leonhard Euler in 1778 to the Academy of Sciences of St. Petersburg. It states that for all integers n and k greater than 1, if the sum of n many kth powers of positive integers is itself a kth power, then n is greater than or equal to k:

$$a_1^k + a_2^k + \dots + a_n^k = b^k \implies n \ge k$$

The conjecture represents an attempt to generalize Fermat's Last Theorem, which is the special case n = 2: if $a_1^k + a_2^k = b^k,$ then 2 ≥ k.

Although the conjecture holds for the case k = 3 (which follows from Fermat's Last Theorem for the third powers), it was disproved for k = 4 and k = 5. It is unknown whether the conjecture fails or holds for any value k ≥ 6.

== Background ==
Euler was aware of the equality 59^{4} + 158^{4} = 133^{4} + 134^{4} involving sums of four fourth powers; this, however, is not a counterexample because no term is isolated on one side of the equation. He also provided a complete solution to the four cubes problem as in Plato's number 3^{3} + 4^{3} + 5^{3} = 6^{3} or the taxicab number 1729. The general solution of the equation $x_1^3+x_2^3=x_3^3+x_4^3$ is
$$\begin{align}
x_1 &=\lambda( 1-(a-3b)(a^2+3b^2)) \\[2pt]
x_2 &=\lambda( (a+3b)(a^2+3b^2)-1 )\\[2pt]
x_3 &=\lambda( (a+3b)-(a^2+3b^2)^2 )\\[2pt]
x_4 &= \lambda( (a^2+3b^2)^2-(a-3b))
\end{align}$$
where a, b and ${\lambda}$ are any rational numbers.

The conjecture was presented in 1778 but only published after Euler's death.

== Counterexamples ==
Euler's conjecture was disproven by L. J. Lander and T. R. Parkin in 1966 when, through a direct computer search on a CDC 6600, they found a counterexample for k = 5. This was published in a paper comprising just two sentences. A total of four primitive (that is, in which the summands do not all have a common factor) counterexamples are known:
$$\begin{align}
144^5 &= 27^5 + 84^5 + 110^5 + 133^5 \\
14132^5 &= (-220)^5 + 5027^5 + 6237^5 + 14068^5 \\
85359^5 &= 55^5 + 3183^5 + 28969^5 + 85282^5 \\
1956878^5 &= 719115^5 + 1331622^5 + (-1340632)^5 + 1956213^5
\end{align}$$
(Lander & Parkin, 1966); (Scher & Seidl, 1996); (Frye, 2004); (Braun, 2026).

In 1986, Noam Elkies found a counterexample for the k = 4 case, which was published in 1988. Elkies' method can be used to construct an infinite sequence of counterexamples for the k = 4 case, with his smallest counterexample being
$$20615673^4 = 2682440^4 + 15365639^4 + 18796760^4.$$

A particular case of Elkies' solutions can be reduced to the identity
$$(85v^2 + 484v - 313)^4 + (68v^2 - 586v + 10)^4 + (2u)^4 = (357v^2 - 204v + 363)^4,$$
where
$$u^2 = 22030 + 28849v - 56158v^2 + 36941v^3 - 31790v^4.$$
This is an elliptic curve with a rational point at v_{1} = −31/467. From this initial rational point, one can compute an infinite collection of others. Substituting v_{1} into the identity and removing common factors gives the numerical example cited above.

In 1988, Roger Frye found the smallest possible counterexample
$$95800^4 + 217519^4 + 414560^4 = 422481^4$$
for k = 4 by a direct computer search using techniques suggested by Elkies. This solution is the only one with values of the variables below 1,000,000.

== Generalizations ==
One interpretation of Plato's number, 3^{3} + 4^{3} + 5^{3} = 6^{3}

In 1967, L. J. Lander, T. R. Parkin, and John Selfridge conjectured that if

$$\sum_{i=1}^{n} a_i^k = \sum_{j=1}^{m} b_j^k$$,

where a_{i} ≠ b_{j} are positive integers for all 1 ≤ i ≤ n and 1 ≤ j ≤ m, then m + n ≥ k. In the special case m = 1, the conjecture states that if

$$\sum_{i=1}^{n} a_i^k = b^k$$

(under the conditions given above) then n ≥ k − 1.

The special case may be described as the problem of giving a partition of a perfect power into few like powers. For k = 4, 5, 7, 8 and n = k or k − 1, there are many known solutions. Some of these are listed below.

See OEIS: A347773 for more data.

=== k = 3 ===
From Fermat's Last Theorem, we know that there can't be a solution to $a^3 + b^3 = c^3$. (The minimum positive value of a sum of third powers is $9^3 - 8^3 - 6^3 = 1$, which provides a solution to the equation (a = (1, 6, 8), b = 9), where however the smallest member isn't larger than 1.)

The smallest solution with terms > 1 is
$$3^3 + 4^3 + 5^3 = 6^3$$
(Plato's number 216) This is the case a = 1, b = 0 of Srinivasa Ramanujan's formula
$$(3a^2+5ab-5b^2)^3 + (4a^2-4ab+6b^2)^3 + (5a^2-5ab-3b^2)^3 = (6a^2-4ab+4b^2)^3$$

A cube as the sum of three cubes can also be parameterized in one of two ways:
$$\begin{align}
a^3(a^3+b^3)^3	&=	b^3(a^3+b^3)^3+a^3(a^3-2b^3)^3+b^3(2a^3-b^3)^3 \\[6pt]
a^3(a^3+2b^3)^3	&=	a^3(a^3-b^3)^3+b^3(a^3-b^3)^3+b^3(2a^3+b^3)^3.
\end{align}$$
The number 2,100,000^{3} can be expressed as the sum of three positive cubes in nine different ways.

=== k = 4 ===
$$\begin{align}
422481^4 &= 95800^4 + 217519^4 + 414560^4 \\[4pt]
353^4 &= 30^4 + 120^4 + 272^4 + 315^4
\end{align}$$
(R. Frye, 1988); (R. Norrie, smallest, 1911).

=== k = 5 ===
$$\begin{align}
144^5  &= 27^5 + 84^5 + 110^5 + 133^5 \\[2pt]
72^5 &= 19^5 + 43^5 + 46^5 + 47^5 + 67^5 \\[2pt]
94^5 &= 21^5 + 23^5 + 37^5 + 79^5 + 84^5 \\[2pt]
107^5 &= 7^5 + 43^5 + 57^5 + 80^5 + 100^5
\end{align}$$

(Lander & Parkin, 1966); (Lander, Parkin, Selfridge, smallest, 1967); (Lander, Parkin, Selfridge, second smallest, 1967); (Sastry, 1934, third smallest).

=== k = 6 ===
It has been known since 2002 that there are no solutions for k = 6 whose final term is ≤ 730000.

=== k = 7 ===
$$568^7 = 127^7 + 258^7 + 266^7 + 413^7 + 430^7 + 439^7 + 525^7$$

(M. Dodrill, 1999).

=== k = 8 ===
$$1409^8 = 90^8 + 223^8 + 478^8 + 524^8 + 748^8 + 1088^8 + 1190^8 + 1324^8$$

(S. Chase, 2000).

== See also ==
- Jacobi–Madden equation
- Prouhet–Tarry–Escott problem
- Beal conjecture
- Pythagorean quadruple
- Generalized taxicab number
- Sums of powers, a list of related conjectures and theorems
- List of topics named after Leonhard Euler
