= Diophantine equation =

Polynomial equation whose integer solutions are sought

Finding all right triangles with integer side-lengths is equivalent to solving the Diophantine equation $a^2 + b^2 = c^2.$

In mathematics, a Diophantine equation is a polynomial equation with integer coefficients, for which only integer solutions are of interest. A linear Diophantine equation equates the sum of two or more unknowns, with coefficients, to a constant. An exponential Diophantine equation is one in which unknowns can appear in exponents.

Diophantine problems typically have fewer equations than unknowns and involve finding integers that solve all equations simultaneously. Because such systems of equations define algebraic curves, algebraic surfaces, or, more generally, algebraic sets, their study is a part of algebraic geometry that is called Diophantine geometry.

The word Diophantine refers to the Hellenistic mathematician of the 3rd century, Diophantus of Alexandria, who made a study of such equations and was one of the first mathematicians to introduce symbolism into algebra. The mathematical study of Diophantine problems that Diophantus initiated is now called Diophantine analysis.

While individual equations present a kind of puzzle and have been considered throughout history, the formulation of general theories of Diophantine equations, beyond the case of linear and quadratic equations, was an achievement of the twentieth century. However, Hilbert's tenth problem shows that there cannot exist a general algorithm that can decide whether an arbitrary Diophantine equation has an integer solution (much less to find or characterize all such solutions).

== Examples ==
In the following Diophantine equations, w, x, y, and z are the unknowns and the other letters are given constants:

$ax+by = c$	This is a linear Diophantine equation, related to Bézout's identity.
$w^3 + x^3 = y^3 + z^3$	The smallest nontrivial solution in positive integers is 12^{3} + 1^{3} = 9^{3} + 10^{3} = 1729. It was famously given as an evident property of 1729, a taxicab number (also named Hardy–Ramanujan number) by Ramanujan to Hardy while meeting in 1917. There are infinitely many nontrivial solutions.
$x^n + y^n = z^n$	For n = 2 there are infinitely many solutions (x, y, z): the Pythagorean triples. For larger integer values of n, Fermat's Last Theorem (initially claimed in 1637 by Fermat and proved by Andrew Wiles in 1995) states there are no positive integer solutions (x, y, z).
$x^2 - ny^2 = \pm 1$	This is Pell's equation, which is named after the English mathematician John Pell. It was studied by Brahmagupta in the 7th century, as well as by Fermat in the 17th century.
$\frac 4 n = \frac 1 x + \frac 1 y + \frac 1 z$	The Erdős–Straus conjecture states that, for every positive integer n ≥ 2, there exists a solution in x, y, and z, all as positive integers. The fractional form is equivalent to the polynomial equation $4xyz = n(yz+xz+xy).$
$x^4 + y^4 + z^4 = w^4$	Conjectured incorrectly by Euler to have no nontrivial solutions. Proved by Elkies to have infinitely many nontrivial solutions, with a computer search by Frye determining the smallest nontrivial solution, 95800^{4} + 217519^{4} + 414560^{4} = 422481^{4}.

== Linear Diophantine equations ==
=== One equation ===
The simplest linear Diophantine equation takes the form
$$ax+by=c,$$
where $a, b, c$ are given integers. The solutions are described by the following theorem: The linear Diophantine equation $ax+by=c$ has a solution if and only if $d\mid c$, where $d=\gcd(a,b)$. If $x_0,y_0$ is a solution, then all the other solutions (and there are infinitely many in this case) are given by
$$x=x_0+(\frac{b}{d})t \quad y=y_0 - (\frac{a}{d})t$$
where $t$ is an arbitrary integer.

Proof: For the first assertion, if $d=\gcd(a,b)$ then by definition there are integers $e$ and $f$ for which $a=de$ and $b=df$. If there is indeed a solution to the equation, in which case $ax_0+by_0=c$ for some $x_0,y_0$, then
$$c=ax_0+by_0=(de)x_0+(df)y_0=d(ex_0+fy_0).$$
The implication of this is to make $d$ a divisor of $c$. Conversely, say that $d\mid c$, for which we may write $c=dt$ for suitable $t$. By Bezout's identity, there are integers $x_0$ and $y_0$ satisfying $ax_0+by_0=d$. Upon multiplying this equation by $t$, we get that
$$c=dt=(ax_0+by_0)t=a(tx_0)+b(ty_0),$$
whence the original equation $ax+by=c$ has the solution $tx_0,ty_0$. For the second assertion, we may assume that $x_0,y_0$ is a solution. If $x',y'$ is another solution, then $ax_0+by_0=c=ax'+by'$. From a bit of algebra, we derive that
$$a(x'-x_0)=b(y_0-y').$$
When $d=\gcd(a,b)$, we can find coprime integers $r$ and $s$ such that $a=dr$ and $a=ds$. Substituting these values into the last equation and canceling the common factor $d$, one finds that $r(x'-x_0)=s(y_0-y')$. By inspection, $r\mid s(y_0-y')$, and since $\gcd(r,s)=1$, it follows from Euclid's lemma that $r\mid (y_0-y')$. In other words, $y_0-y' = rt$ for some integer $t$. By substitution,
$$\begin{align}
r(x'-x_0)=srt \\ x'- x_0 = st
\end{align}$$
This, in turn, allows us to write the formulas
$$\begin{align}
x'=x_0+st=x_0+(\frac{b}{d})t \\ y' = y_0 - rt = y_0 - (\frac{a}{d})t
\end{align},$$

thus concluding the proof.

=== Chinese remainder theorem ===
The Chinese remainder theorem describes an important class of linear Diophantine systems of equations: let $n_1, \dots, n_k$ be k pairwise coprime integers greater than one, $a_1, \dots, a_k$ be k arbitrary integers, and N be the product $n_1 \cdots n_k.$ The Chinese remainder theorem asserts that the following linear Diophantine system has exactly one solution $(x, x_1, \dots, x_k)$ such that 0 ≤ x < N, and that the other solutions are obtained by adding to x a multiple of N:
$$\begin{align}
x &= a_1 + n_1\,x_1\\
&\;\;\vdots\\
x &= a_k + n_k\,x_k
\end{align}$$

=== System of linear Diophantine equations ===
More generally, every system of linear Diophantine equations may be solved by computing the Smith normal form of its matrix, in a way that is similar to the use of the reduced row echelon form to solve a system of linear equations over a field. Using matrix notation every system of linear Diophantine equations may be written
$$AX = C,$$
where A is an m × n matrix of integers, X is an n × 1 column matrix of unknowns and C is an m × 1 column matrix of integers.

The computation of the Smith normal form of A provides two unimodular matrices (that is matrices that are invertible over the integers and have ±1 as determinant) U and V of respective dimensions m × m and n × n, such that the matrix
$$B = [b_{i,j}] = UAV$$
is such that b_{i,i} is not zero for i not greater than some integer k, and all the other entries are zero. The system to be solved may thus be rewritten as
$$B (V^{-1}X) = UC.$$
Calling y_{i} the entries of V^{−1}X and d_{i} those of D = UC, this leads to the system
$$\begin{align}
& b_{i,i}y_i = d_i, \quad 1 \leq i \leq k \\
& 0y_i = d_i, \quad k < i \leq n.
\end{align}$$

This system is equivalent to the given one in the following sense: A column matrix of integers x is a solution of the given system if and only if x = Vy for some column matrix of integers y such that By = D.

It follows that the system has a solution if and only if b_{i,i} divides d_{i} for i ≤ k and d_{i} = 0 for i > k. If this condition is fulfilled, the solutions of the given system are
$$V\,
\begin{bmatrix}
\frac{d_1}{b_{1,1}}\\
\vdots\\
\frac{d_k}{b_{k,k}}\\
h_{k+1}\\
\vdots\\
h_n
\end{bmatrix}\,,$$
where h_{k+1}, …, h_{n} are arbitrary integers.

Hermite normal form may also be used for solving systems of linear Diophantine equations. However, Hermite normal form does not directly provide the solutions; to get the solutions from the Hermite normal form, one has to successively solve several linear equations. Nevertheless, Richard Zippel wrote that the Smith normal form "is somewhat more than is actually needed to solve linear diophantine equations. Instead of reducing the equation to diagonal form, we only need to make it triangular, which is called the Hermite normal form. The Hermite normal form is substantially easier to compute than the Smith normal form."

Integer linear programming amounts to finding some integer solutions (optimal in some sense) of linear systems that include also inequations. Thus systems of linear Diophantine equations are basic in this context, and textbooks on integer programming usually have a treatment of systems of linear Diophantine equations.

== Homogeneous equations ==
A homogeneous Diophantine equation is a Diophantine equation that is defined by a homogeneous polynomial. A typical such equation is the equation of Fermat's Last Theorem

$$x^d+y^d -z^d=0.$$

As a homogeneous polynomial in n indeterminates defines a hypersurface in the projective space of dimension n − 1, solving a homogeneous Diophantine equation is the same as finding the rational points of a projective hypersurface.

Solving a homogeneous Diophantine equation is generally a very difficult problem, even in the simplest non-trivial case of three indeterminates (in the case of two indeterminates the problem is equivalent with testing if a rational number is the dth power of another rational number). A witness of the difficulty of the problem is Fermat's Last Theorem (for d > 2, there is no integer solution of the above equation), which needed more than three centuries of mathematicians' efforts before being solved.

For degrees higher than three, most known results are theorems asserting that there are no solutions (for example Fermat's Last Theorem) or that the number of solutions is finite (for example Faltings' theorem).

For the degree three, there are general solving methods, which work on almost all equations that are encountered in practice, but no algorithm is known that works for every cubic equation.

=== Degree two ===
Homogeneous Diophantine equations of degree two are easier to solve. The standard solving method proceeds in two steps. One has first to find one solution, or to prove that there is no solution. When a solution has been found, all solutions are then deduced.

For proving that there is no solution, one may reduce the equation modulo p. For example, the Diophantine equation

$$x^2+y^2=3z^2,$$

does not have any other solution than the trivial solution (0, 0, 0). In fact, by dividing x, y, and z by their greatest common divisor, one may suppose that they are coprime. The squares modulo 4 are congruent to 0 and 1. Thus the left-hand side of the equation is congruent to 0, 1, or 2, and the right-hand side is congruent to 0 or 3. Thus the equality may be obtained only if x, y, and z are all even, and are thus not coprime. Thus the only solution is the trivial solution (0, 0, 0). This shows that there is no rational point on a circle of radius $\sqrt{3}$, centered at the origin.

More generally, the Hasse–Minkowski theorem determines whether a homogeneous quadratic equation has a nontrivial rational solution by testing solvability over the real numbers and over the p-adic numbers; clearing denominators then gives a nontrivial integer solution.

If a non-trivial integer solution is known, one may produce all other solutions in the following way.

==== Geometric interpretation ====
Let

$$Q(x_1, \ldots, x_n)=0$$

be a homogeneous Diophantine equation, where $Q(x_1, \ldots, x_n)$ is a quadratic form (that is, a homogeneous polynomial of degree 2), with integer coefficients. The trivial solution is the solution where all $x_i$ are zero. If $(a_1, \ldots, a_n)$ is a non-trivial integer solution of this equation, then $\left(a_1, \ldots, a_n\right)$ are the homogeneous coordinates of a rational point of the hypersurface defined by Q. Conversely, if $\left(\frac {p_1}q, \ldots, \frac {p_n}q \right)$ are homogeneous coordinates of a rational point of this hypersurface, where $q, p_1, \ldots, p_n$ are integers, then $\left(p_1, \ldots, p_n\right)$ is an integer solution of the Diophantine equation. Moreover, the integer solutions that define a given rational point are all sequences of the form

$$\left(k\frac{p_1}d, \ldots, k\frac{p_n}d\right),$$

where k is any integer, and d is the greatest common divisor of the $p_i.$

It follows that solving the Diophantine equation $Q(x_1, \ldots, x_n)=0$ is completely reduced to finding the rational points of the corresponding projective hypersurface.

==== Parameterization ====
Let now $A=\left(a_1, \ldots, a_n\right)$ be an integer solution of the equation $Q(x_1, \ldots, x_n)=0.$ As Q is a polynomial of degree two, a line passing through A crosses the hypersurface at a single other point, which is rational if and only if the line is rational (that is, if the line is defined by rational parameters). This allows parameterizing the hypersurface by the lines passing through A, and the rational points are those that are obtained from rational lines, that is, those that correspond to rational values of the parameters.

More precisely, one may proceed as follows.

By permuting the indices, one may suppose, without loss of generality that $a_n\ne 0.$ Then one may pass to the affine case by considering the affine hypersurface defined by

$$q(x_1,\ldots,x_{n-1})=Q(x_1, \ldots, x_{n-1},1),$$

which has the rational point

$$R= (r_1, \ldots, r_{n-1})=\left(\frac{a_1}{a_n}, \ldots, \frac{a_{n-1}}{a_n}\right).$$

If this rational point is a singular point, that is if all partial derivatives are zero at R, all lines passing through R are contained in the hypersurface, and one has a cone. The change of variables

$$y_i=x_i-r_i$$

does not change the rational points, and transforms q into a homogeneous polynomial in n − 1 variables. In this case, the problem may thus be solved by applying the method to an equation with fewer variables.

If the polynomial q is a product of linear polynomials (possibly with non-rational coefficients), then it defines two hyperplanes. The intersection of these hyperplanes is a rational flat, and contains rational singular points. This case is thus a special instance of the preceding case.

In the general case, consider the parametric equation of a line passing through R:

$$\begin{align}
x_2 &= r_2 + t_2(x_1-r_1)\\
&\;\;\vdots\\
x_{n-1} &= r_{n-1} + t_{n-1}(x_1-r_1).
\end{align}$$

Substituting this in q, one gets a polynomial of degree two in x_{1}, that is zero for x_{1} = r_{1}. It is thus divisible by x_{1} − r_{1}. The quotient is linear in x_{1}, and may be solved for expressing x_{1} as a quotient of two polynomials of degree at most two in $t_2, \ldots, t_{n-1},$ with integer coefficients:

$$x_1=\frac{f_1(t_2, \ldots, t_{n-1})}{f_n(t_2, \ldots, t_{n-1})}.$$

Substituting this in the expressions for $x_2, \ldots, x_{n-1},$ one gets, for i = 1, …, n − 1,

$$x_i=\frac{f_i(t_2, \ldots, t_{n-1})}{f_n(t_2, \ldots, t_{n-1})},$$

where $f_1, \ldots, f_n$ are polynomials of degree at most two with integer coefficients.

Then, one can return to the homogeneous case. Let, for i = 1, …, n,

$$F_i(t_1, \ldots, t_{n-1})=t_1^2 f_i\left(\frac{t_2}{t_1}, \ldots, \frac{t_{n-1}}{t_1} \right),$$

be the homogenization of $f_i.$ These quadratic polynomials with integer coefficients form a parameterization of the projective hypersurface defined by Q:

$$\begin{align}
x_1&= F_1(t_1, \ldots, t_{n-1})\\
&\;\;\vdots\\
x_n&= F_n(t_1, \ldots, t_{n-1}).
\end{align}$$

A point of the projective hypersurface defined by Q is rational if and only if it may be obtained from rational values of $t_1, \ldots, t_{n-1}.$ As $F_1, \ldots,F_n$ are homogeneous polynomials, the point is not changed if all t_{i} are multiplied by the same rational number. Thus, one may suppose that $t_1, \ldots, t_{n-1}$ are coprime integers. It follows that the integer solutions of the Diophantine equation are exactly the sequences $(x_1, \ldots, x_n)$ where, for i = 1, ..., n,

$$x_i= k\,\frac{F_i(t_1, \ldots, t_{n-1})}{d},$$

where k is an integer, $t_1, \ldots, t_{n-1}$ are coprime integers, and d is the greatest common divisor of the n integers $F_i(t_1, \ldots, t_{n-1}).$

One could conjecture that the coprimality of the t_{i}, could imply that d = 1. This is not the case, as shown in the next section.

==== Example of Pythagorean triples ====
The equation

$$x^2+y^2-z^2=0$$

is probably the first homogeneous Diophantine equation of degree two that has been studied. Its solutions are the Pythagorean triples. This is also the homogeneous equation of the unit circle. In this section, we show how the above method allows retrieving Euclid's formula for generating Pythagorean triples.

For retrieving exactly Euclid's formula, we start from the solution (−1, 0, 1), corresponding to the point (−1, 0) of the unit circle. A line passing through this point may be parameterized by its slope:

$$y=t(x+1).$$

Putting this in the circle equation

$$x^2+y^2-1=0,$$

one gets

$$x^2-1 +t^2(x+1)^2=0.$$

Dividing by x + 1, results in

$$x-1+t^2(x+1)=0,$$

which is easy to solve in x:

$$x=\frac{1-t^2}{1+t^2}.$$

It follows

$$y=t(x+1) = \frac{2t}{1+t^2}.$$

Homogenizing as described above one gets all solutions as

$$\begin{align}
x&=k\,\frac{s^2-t^2}{d}\\
y&=k\,\frac{2st}{d}\\
z&=k\,\frac{s^2+t^2}{d},
\end{align}$$

where k is any integer, s and t are coprime integers, and d is the greatest common divisor of the three numerators. In fact, d = 2 if s and t are both odd, and d = 1 if one is odd and the other is even.

The primitive triples are the solutions where k = 1 and s > t > 0.

This description of the solutions differs slightly from Euclid's formula because Euclid's formula considers only the solutions such that x, y, and z are all positive, and does not distinguish between two triples that differ by the exchange of x and y,

== Diophantine analysis ==
=== Typical questions ===
The questions asked in Diophantine analysis include:

1. Are there any solutions?
2. Are there any solutions beyond some that are easily found by inspection?
3. Are there finitely or infinitely many solutions?
4. Can all solutions be found in theory?
5. Can one in practice compute a full list of solutions?

These traditional problems often lay unsolved for centuries, and mathematicians gradually came to understand their depth (in some cases), rather than treat them as puzzles.

=== Typical puzzle ===
A father's age written in digits AB is the reverse of his son's age BA. Also the father's age is 1 less than twice the son's age. How old are they? The conditions lead to the equation 10A + B = 2(10B + A) – 1, thus 19B – 8A = 1. A general method for such linear equations is given above, but mere inspection gives A = 7, B = 3, so that AB = 73 years and BA = 37 years. One may easily show this is the only solution where A and B are integer digits between 0 and 9.

Many well known puzzles in recreational mathematics lead to Diophantine equations, such as the cannonball problem, Archimedes's cattle problem and the monkey and the coconuts.

=== 17th and 18th centuries ===
In 1637, Pierre de Fermat scribbled on the margin of his copy of Arithmetica: "It is impossible to separate a cube into two cubes, or a fourth power into two fourth powers, or in general, any power higher than the second into two like powers." Stated in more modern language, "The equation a^{n} + b^{n} = c^{n} has no solutions for any n higher than 2." Following this, he wrote: "I have discovered a truly marvelous proof of this proposition, which this margin is too narrow to contain." Such a proof eluded mathematicians for centuries, however, and as such his statement became famous as Fermat's Last Theorem. It was not until 1995 that it was proven by the British mathematician Andrew Wiles.

In 1657, Fermat attempted to solve the Diophantine equation 61x^{2} + 1 = y^{2} (solved by Brahmagupta over 1000 years earlier). The equation was eventually solved by Euler in the early 18th century, who also solved a number of other Diophantine equations. The smallest solution of this equation in positive integers is x = 226153980, y = 1766319049 (see Chakravala method).

=== Hilbert's tenth problem ===
In 1900, David Hilbert proposed the solvability of all Diophantine equations as the tenth of his fundamental problems: to find an algorithm to determine whether a given polynomial Diophantine equation with integer coefficients has an integer solution. In 1970, Yuri Matiyasevich solved it negatively, building on work of Julia Robinson, Martin Davis, and Hilary Putnam to prove that a general algorithm for solving all Diophantine equations cannot exist.

The result rests on a stronger, positive statement. The MRDP theorem characterizes the sets of natural numbers that are Diophantine—those consisting of the values taken by one variable in the solutions of a polynomial equation—as exactly the recursively enumerable sets. Hilbert's tenth problem follows as a corollary, since there are recursively enumerable sets that are not decidable. The characterization also yields Diophantine representations of sets not usually described by equations, such as the prime numbers.

=== Diophantine geometry ===
Diophantine geometry, is the application of techniques from algebraic geometry which considers equations that also have a geometric meaning. The central idea of Diophantine geometry is that of a rational point, namely a solution to a polynomial equation or a system of polynomial equations, which is a vector in a prescribed field K, when K is not algebraically closed.

=== Modern research ===
The oldest general method for solving a Diophantine equation—or for proving that there is no solution— is the method of infinite descent, which was introduced by Pierre de Fermat. Another general method is the Hasse principle that uses modular arithmetic modulo all prime numbers for finding the solutions. Despite many improvements these methods cannot solve most Diophantine equations.

During the 20th century, a new approach has been deeply explored, consisting of using algebraic geometry. In fact, a Diophantine equation can be viewed as the equation of a hypersurface, and the solutions of the equation are the points of the hypersurface that have integer coordinates.

This approach led eventually to the proof by Andrew Wiles in 1994 of Fermat's Last Theorem, stated without proof around 1637. This is another illustration of the difficulty of solving Diophantine equations.

=== Infinite Diophantine equations ===
An example of an infinite Diophantine equation is:
$$n = a^2 + 2b^2 + 3c^2 + 4d^2 + 5e^2 + \cdots,$$
which can be expressed as "How many ways can a given integer n be written as the sum of a square plus twice a square plus thrice a square and so on?" The number of ways this can be done for each n forms an integer sequence. Infinite Diophantine equations are related to theta functions and infinite dimensional lattices. This equation always has a solution for any positive n. Compare this to:
$$n = a^2 + 4b^2 + 9c^2 + 16d^2 + 25e^2 + \cdots,$$
which does not always have a solution for positive n.

== Exponential Diophantine equations ==
If a Diophantine equation has as an additional variable or variables occurring as exponents, it is an exponential Diophantine equation. Examples include:

- the Ramanujan–Nagell equation, 2^{n} − 7 = x^{2}
- the equation of the Fermat–Catalan conjecture and Beal's conjecture, a^{m} + b^{n} = c^{k} with inequality restrictions on the exponents
- the Erdős–Moser equation, 1^{k} + 2^{k} + ⋯ + (m − 1)^{k} = m^{k}

A general theory for such equations is not available; particular cases such as Catalan's conjecture and Fermat's Last Theorem have been tackled. However, the majority are solved via ad-hoc methods such as Størmer's theorem or even trial and error.

== See also ==
- Kuṭṭaka, Aryabhata's algorithm for solving linear Diophantine equations in two unknowns
- Lander, Parkin, and Selfridge conjecture for integer solutions of equations which contain sums of like powers
