= Uniplex =

Uniplex may refer to:

- Simplex
- Uniplexed, the rumored U in Unix (or Unics); as opposed to the multiplexed of Multics
- Uniplex (UK) Ltd., litigant in a European Court of Justice case regarding promptness in taking legal action

== See also ==
- Simplex (disambiguation)
- Duplex (disambiguation)
- Multiplex (disambiguation)
