= Cebuano numerals =

Cebuano language feature

The Cebuano numbers are the system of number names used in Cebuano to express quantities and other information related to numbers. Cebuano has two number systems: the native system and the Spanish-derived system. The native system is mostly used for counting small numbers, basic measurement, and for other pre-existing native concepts that deals with numbers. Meanwhile, the Spanish-derived system is mainly used for concepts that only existed post-colonially such as counting large numbers, currency, solar time, and advanced mathematics.

== History ==
Unlike other Philippine languages, the native number system of Cebuano was derived solely from the non-human forms of Proto-Austronesian numerals instead of a combination of both human and non-human numerals, such as in Tagalog and Hiligaynon. The numbers were first recorded by chronicler Antonio Pigafetta during Magellan's expedition.

Cebuano Numbers as recorded by Antonio Pigafetta (1521)
1	2	3	4	5	6	7	8	9	10
uzza	dua	tolo	upat	lima	onom	pitto	gualu	ciam	polo

== Types ==
The native numbers are categorized into four types: cardinal, ordinal, distributive, and multiplicative (also referred to as "viceral" or "adverbial"). The multiples of ten are formed by attaching the circumfix "ka-ø-an" (e.g. kawaloan). Those that are within the 20-60 range undergo the process of metathesis and syncope (e.g. katloan, from katuloan).

=== Cardinal ===
Number	Native	Spanish-derived
1	usá	uno
2	duhá	dos
3	tuló	tres
4	upát	kwatro
5	limá	singku
6	unóm	says
7	pitó	syete, siti
8	waló	otso
9	siyám	nuybi
10	napulò, pulò	dyis
11	napúlog usá	onse
12	napúlog duhá	dose
13	napúlog tuló	trese
14	napúlog upát	katórse
15	napúlog limá	kinse
16	napúlog unóm	diyesiséys, disisays
17	napúlog pitó	diyesisiyete, disisiti
18	napúlog waló	diyesiyotso, disiutsu
19	napúlog siyám	diyesinwebe, disinuybi
20	kaluháan (kaduháan)	beynte, baynti
21	kaluháag usá	beyntiwuno, bayntiuno
22	kaluháag duhá	beyntidos, bayntidus
23	kaluháag tuló	beyntitres, bayntitris
24	kaluháag upát	beyntikwatro, bayntikwatru
25	kaluháag limá	beyntisingko, bayntisingku
30	katlóan (katulóan)	treynta, traynta, trinta
40	kap-atan (kaupátan)	kwarénta, kwarinta
50	kalím-an (kalimáan)	sinkwénta, singkwinta
60	kan-óman (kaunóman)	sesenta, sisinta
70	kapitóan	seténta, sitinta
80	kawalóan	otsénta, utsinta
90	kasiyáman	nobénta
100	usá ka gatós	siyén, siyento
200	duhá ka gatós	dosiyéntos, dosentos
300	tuló ka gatós	tresiyéntos, tresentos
400	upát ka gatós	kwatrosiyéntos, kwatrosentos
500	limá ka gatós	kiniyéntos, kinyentos
1,000	usá ka libo, libo	mil
5,000	limá ka libo	singko mil
10,000	usá ka laksà, napulò ka libo	dyis mil
50,000	limá ka laksà, kalím-an ka libo	singkwenta mil
100,000	usá ka yaba, usá ka gatós ka líbo	siyén mil
1,000,000	usá ka yukót	milyón
1,000,000,000	usá ka wakát	bilyón (US-influence, common), mil milyones (rare)

Like other Visayan languages, cardinal numbers are linked to the noun with the ligature ka.

usá ka tawo a/one person
kaluhaan ug usá ka bulan twenty-one months

=== Ordinal ===
Ordinal numbers in Cebuano are formed using the ika- prefix, except una. Likewise, the question word for "what order?" is ikapila.

Number	Cebuano
1st	kina-unhán
2nd	ikaduhá
3rd	ikatuló
4th	ikaupát
5th	ikalimá
6th	ikaunóm
7th	ikapitó
8th	ikawaló
9th	ikasiyám
10th	ikanapulò, ikapulò
11th	ikanapúlog-usá
20th	ikakaluháan
21st	ikakaluháag-usá
25th	ikakaluháag-limá
30th	ikakatlóan
40th	ikakap-atan
50th	ikakalím-an
60th	ikakan-óman
70th	ikakapitóan
80th	ikakawalóan
90th	ikakasiyáman
100th	ikagatós
200th	ikaduhá ka gatós
500th	ikalimá ka gatós
1,000th	ikalibo
5,000th	ikalimá ka libo
10,000th	ikalaksà, ikanapulò ka libo
50,000th	ikalimá ka laksà, ikakalím-an ka libo
100,000th	ikayaba
1,000,000th	ikayukót
1,000,000,000th	ikawakát

=== Distributive ===
Distributive numbers in Cebuano are formed by attaching the tag- prefix to the numerical root. Irregular words may be formed depending on the number being attached to. The question word tagpíla means "How much?" referring to the price of items.

Number	Cebuano
1	tagsa
2	tagurha
3	tagutlo, tag-tulo
4	tag-upat
5	taglima
6	tag-unom
7	tagpito
8	tagwalo
9	tagsiyam
10	tagnapulò, tagpulò
11	tagnapúlog-usá
20	tagkaluháan
21	tagkaluháag-usá
25	tagkaluháag-limá
30	tagkatlóan
40	tagkap-atan
50	tagkalím-an
60	tagkan-óman
70	tagkapitóan
80	tagkawalóan
90	tagkasiyáman
100	taggatós
200	tagurha ka gatós
500	tagilma ka gatós
1,000	taglibo
5,000	tagilma ka libo
10,000	taglaksà, tagnapulò ka libo
50,000	tagilma ka laksà, tagkalím-an ka libo
100,000	tagyaba
1,000,000	tagyukót
1,000,000,000	tagwakát

=== Multiplicative ===
Multiplicative (or viceral) numbers in Cebuano are formed using the ka- prefix. The prefixes "naka-" and "maka-" may also be used to specify if the number is used in the nasugdan or pagasugdan aspect, respectively. The question word for this is kapila.

Number	Cebuano
1 (once)	kausá, kás-a
2 (twice)	kaduhá
3 (thrice)	katuló
4	kaupát
5	kalimá
6	kaunóm
7	kapitó
8	kawaló
9	kasiyám
10	kanapulò, kapulò
11	kanapúlog-usá
20	kakaluháan
21	kakaluháag-usá
25	kakaluháag-limá
30	kakatlóan
40	kakap-atan
50	kakalím-an
60	kakan-óman
70	kakapitóan
80	kakawalóan
90	kakasiyáman
100	kagatós
200	kaduhá ka gatós
500	kalimá ka gatós
1,000	kalibo
5,000	kalimá ka libo
10,000	kalaksà, kanapulò ka libo
50,000	kalimá ka laksà, kakalím-an ka libo
100,000	kayaba
1,000,000	kayukót
1,000,000,000	kawakát

== See also ==
- Cebuano language
- Cebuano grammar
