= Multiplex =

Multiplex may refer to:

== Science and technology ==
- Multiplex communication, combining many signals into one transmission circuit or channel
  - Multiplex (television), a group of digital television or radio channels that are combined for broadcast
- Multiplex (assay), a biological assay which measures several components at the same time
- Multiplex, another name for plywood, a composite material manufactured from thin layers of wood veneer

== Other uses ==
- Multiplex (automobile), a former American car make
- Multiplex (comics), a DC comic book supervillain
- Multiplex (company), a global contracting and development company
- Multiplex (highway) or concurrency, a single road designated by multiple highway numbers
- Multiplex (juggling), a juggling action with multiple balls thrown or caught at one time by the same hand
- Multiplex (movie theater), a theater with many screens
- Multiplexity (sociolinguistics), a social network in which members share multiple social context ties, such as work, neighborhood, or familial.
- Multiplex (webcomic), an online comic about the staff of a movie theater

== See also ==
- Multiplex Modellsport, a manufacturer of radio control equipment and radio-controlled airplanes
- Multiplexer, an electronic device that performs multiplexing
- Multiplexing, transmitting or receiving multiple signal streams
- MUX (disambiguation)
