= Multiplier (linguistics) =

Word indicating multiples of an object

Distributive numbers versus multipliers
Distributive numbers	singly	doubly	triply
Multipliers	single	double	triple

In linguistics, more precisely in traditional grammar, a multiplier is a word that counts how many times its object should be multiplied, such as single or double. They are contrasted with distributive numbers. In English, this part of speech is relatively marginal and less recognized than cardinal numbers and ordinal numbers.

== English ==
In English native multipliers exist, formed by the suffix -fold, as in onefold, twofold, threefold. However, these have largely been replaced by single, double, and triple, which are of Latin origin, via French. They have a corresponding distributive number formed by suffixing -y (reduction of Middle English -lely > -ly), as in singly. However, the series is primarily used for the first few numbers; quadruple and quintuple are less common, and hextuple and above are quite rare. For larger multiples a cardinal number and a counter are used instead, such as "five portions" or "a portion five times the normal size" instead of "a quintuple portion".

In espresso servings, the Italian solo, doppio, and triplo are sometimes used, with doppio being most common.

The Latin multipliers simplex, duplex, triplex etc. have occasional use in English, primarily in technical use, though duplex is more common.

== See also ==
- Cardinal number
- Distributive number
- Ordinal number
- Multiple (mathematics)
- Numeral (linguistics)
