= Ordinal numeral =

Word representing the position or rank in a sequential order

Cardinal versus ordinal numbers
Cardinal	one	two	three	four
Cardinal	1	2	3	4
Ordinal	first	second	third	fourth
Ordinal	1st	2nd	3rd	4th

In linguistics, ordinal numerals or ordinal number words are words representing position or rank in a sequential order; the order may be of size, importance, chronology, and so on (e.g., "third", "tertiary"). They differ from cardinal numerals, which represent quantity (e.g., "three") and other types of numerals. In English, they may be written with numerals and letter suffixes, such as 1st, 2nd, and 3rd.

== Grammar ==
In traditional grammar, all numerals, including ordinal numerals, are grouped into a separate part of speech (Latin: nomen numerale, hence, "noun numeral" in older English grammar books). However, in modern interpretations of English grammar, ordinal numerals are usually considered adjectives.

Ordinal numbers may be written in English with numerals and letter suffixes: 1st, 2nd or 2d, 3rd or 3d, 4th, 11th, 21st, 101st, 477th, etc., with the suffix acting as an ordinal indicator. Written dates often omit the suffix, although it is nevertheless pronounced. For example: 5 November 1605 (pronounced "the fifth of November ... "); November 5, 1605, ("November (the) Fifth ..."). When written out in full with "of", however, the suffix is retained: the 5th of November. In other languages, different ordinal indicators are used to write ordinal numbers.

== How ordinals are formed by language ==
=== Oral/spoken languages ===
==== English ====
In English, the main ordinal series is 'first', 'second', .... It is used in a variety of rankings, including time ('the first hour of the event'), space ('the first left'), and quality ('first class cabin').

With the exception of the word 'second', the main ordinal series are all words derived from Old English. ('Second', which came from Latin into English via French around 1300, replaced the Old English word for 'other', which no longer carries the definition of second, except in certain phrases like "every other day").

The Latinate series 'primary', 'secondary', ... is often used for importance, or precedence ('primary consideration') and sequence of dependence ('secondary effect', 'secondary boycott', 'secondary industry'), though there are other uses as well ('primary school', 'primary election'). The first two in the sequence are by far the most common; 'tertiary' appears occasionally, and higher numbers are rare except in specialized contexts ('quaternary period').

The Greek series proto-, deutero-, trito-, ... is only found in prefixes, generally scholarly and technical coinages, e.g. protagonist, deuteragonist, tritagonist; protium, deuterium, tritium; Proto-Isaiah, Deutero-Isaiah. Numbers beyond three are rare; those beyond four are obscure.

The first twelve variations of ordinal numbers are given here.

Spatial or chronological	Precedence or effect	Greek prefix
first	primary	proto-
second	secondary	deutero-
third	tertiary	trito-
fourth	quaternary, quartary	tetarto-
fifth	quinary	(pempto-)
sixth	senary	(ecto-, hecto-)
seventh	septenary	(ebdomo-, hebdomo-)
eighth	octonary	(ogdo-)
ninth	nonary	(enato-)
tenth	decenary	(decato-)
eleventh	undenary	(endecato-)
twelfth	duodenary	(dodecato-)

The spatial and chronological ordinal numbers corresponding to cardinals from 13 to 19 are the number followed by the suffix -th, as "sixteenth". For multiples of ten, the same principle applies, with terminal -y changed to -ieth, as "sixtieth". For other numbers, the elements of the cardinal number are used, with the last word replaced by the ordinal: 23 → "twenty-third"; 523 → "five hundred twenty-third" (British English: "five hundred and twenty-third").

When speaking the numbers in fractions, the spatial/chronological numbering system is used for denominators larger than 2 (2 as the denominator of a fraction is "half" rather than "second"), with a denominator of 4 sometimes spoken as "quarter" rather than "fourth". This system results in "two thirds" for 2/3 and "fifteen thirty-seconds" for 15/32. This system is normally used for denominators less than 100 and for many powers of 10. Examples include "six ten-thousandths" for 6/10,000 and "three hundredths" for 0.03.

==== Chinese ====
In Chinese, ordinal numbers are formed by adding 第 (pinyin: dì, Jyutping: dai6) before the cardinal numbers.

	Cardinal	Ordinal
1st	一	第一
2nd	二	第二
3rd	三	第三
4th	四	第四
5th	五	第五
10th	十	第十
72nd	七十二	第七十二
100th	一百	第一百

=== Signed languages ===
==== American Sign Language ====
In American Sign Language, the ordinal numbers first through ninth are formed with handshapes similar to those for the corresponding cardinal numbers with the addition of a small twist of the wrist.

== See also ==
- Distributive number – Word that answers "how many times each?"
- English ordinal numbers – Names of numbers in English
- Multiplier (linguistics) – Word indicating multiples of an object
- Ordinal indicator – Character(s) following an ordinal number (used when writing ordinal numbers, such as a super-script)
- Ordinal number – Generalization of "n-th" to infinite cases (the related, but more formal and abstract, usage in mathematics)
- Ordinal data, in statistics
- Ordinal date – Date written as number of days since first day of year
- Regnal ordinal – Concept in heraldry
