= Multiple (mathematics) =

Product with an integer

In mathematics, a multiple is the product of any quantity and an integer. In other words, for the quantities $a$ and $b$, it can be said that $b$ is a multiple of $a$ if $b=n\cdot a$ for some integer n, which is called the multiplier. If $a$ is not zero, this is equivalent to saying that $b/a$ is an integer.

When a and b are both integers, and b is a multiple of a, then a is called a divisor of b. One says also that a divides b. If a and b are not integers, mathematicians prefer generally to use integer multiple instead of multiple, for clarification. In fact, multiple is used for other kinds of product; for example, a polynomial p is a multiple of another polynomial q if there exists third polynomial r such that p = qr.

== Examples ==
14, 49, −21 and 0 are multiples of 7, whereas 3 and −6 are not. This is because there are integers that 7 may be multiplied by to reach the values of 14, 49, 0 and −21, while there are no such integers for 3 and −6. Each of the products listed below, and in particular, the products for 3 and −6, is the only way that the relevant number can be written as a product of 7 and another real number:

- $14 = 7 \times 2;$
- $49 = 7 \times 7;$
- $-21 = 7 \times (-3);$
- $0 = 7 \times 0;$
- $3 = 7 \times (3/7), \quad 3/7$ is not an integer;
- $-6 = 7 \times (-6/7), \quad -6/7$ is not an integer.

== Properties ==
- 0 is a multiple of every number ($0=0\cdot a$).
- The product of any integer $n$ and any integer is a multiple of $n$. In particular, $n$, which is equal to $n \times 1$, is a multiple of $n$ (every integer is a multiple of itself), since 1 is an integer.
- If $a$ and $b$ are multiples of $x,$ then $a + b$ and $a - b$ are also multiples of $x$.

== Submultiple ==
In some texts, "a is a submultiple of b" has the meaning of "a being a unit fraction of b" (a=b/n) or, equivalently, "b being an integer multiple n of a" (b=n a). This terminology is also used with units of measurement (for example by the BIPM and NIST), where a unit submultiple is obtained by prefixing the main unit, defined as the quotient of the main unit by an integer, mostly a power of 10^{3}. For example, a millimetre is the 1000-fold submultiple of a metre. As another example, one inch may be considered as a 12-fold submultiple of a foot, or a 36-fold submultiple of a yard.

== See also ==
- Unit fraction
- Ideal (ring theory)
- Decimal and SI prefix
- Multiplier (linguistics)
