= Cardinal numeral =

Part of speech used to count

Cardinal versus ordinal numbers
Cardinal		Ordinal	
zero	0	zeroth	0th
one	1	first	1st
two	2	second	2nd
three	3	third	3rd
four	4	fourth	4th
five	5	fifth	5th
six	6	sixth	6th
seven	7	seventh	7th
eight	8	eighth	8th
nine	9	ninth	9th
ten	10	tenth	10th
eleven	11	eleventh	11th
twelve	12	twelfth	12th
thirteen	13	thirteenth	13th
fourteen	14	fourteenth	14th
fifteen	15	fifteenth	15th

In linguistics, and more precisely in traditional grammar, a cardinal numeral (or cardinal number word) is a part of speech used to count.

Examples in English are the words one, two, three, and the compounds three hundred [and] forty-two and nine hundred [and] sixty. Cardinal numerals are classified as definite, and are related to ordinal numbers, such as the English first, second, third, etc.

== See also ==
- Arity
- Cardinal number for the related usage in mathematics
- English numerals (in particular the Cardinal numbers section)
- Distributive number
- Multiplier
- Nominal numeral
- Numeral for examples of number systems
- Valency
- Roman numerals
- Latin numerals
- Greek numerals
