= MUX =

MUX, Mux, or mux may refer to:

== Technology ==
- Multiplexer, in circuit design
- Multiplex (television), a grouping of program services as interleaved data packets
- mux (windowing system), the windowing system for the Blit computer terminal
- MUX clamp, a tool used in deep sea drilling operations

== Other uses ==
- Multan International Airport (IATA code), Pakistan
- Multi-user experience, a computer gaming term; see MU*
- Marginal utility of good x (MUx), in the marginal rate of substitution
- Isuzu MU-X, a SUV by Japanese Automobile Isuzu
- Mux (company), a video technology company.

== See also ==
- Mux Mool, American electronic musician, DJ, and producer
- Muxe, Zapotec transgender term
- Multiplex (disambiguation)
