= Cebuano grammar =

Grammar of the Cebuano language

Cebuano grammar encompasses the rules that define the Cebuano language, the most widely spoken of all the languages in the Visayan Group of languages, spoken in Cebu, Bohol, Siquijor, part of Leyte island, part of Samar island, Negros Oriental, especially in Dumaguete, and the majority of cities and provinces of Mindanao.

Cebuano has eight basic parts of speech: nouns, pronouns, verbs, adjectives, adverbs, particles, prepositions and conjunctions. Cebuano is an agglutinative yet partially inflected language: pronouns are inflected for number, and verbs are inflected for aspect, focus, and mood.

== Morphosyntactic alignment ==
Cebuano, along with many other Philippine languages, are sometimes considered ergative or nominative in alignment, both being incorrect and correct as it has features of both systems.

Cebuano verbs are morphologically complex and take on a variety of affixes reflecting voice, quality, aspect, mood, and others. Cebuano arguably follows Austronesian alignment. Basically, verbs conjugate by using these affixes according to which argumentative role the noun in the direct case has. This noun in the direct case can be the doer of the action, the recipient of the action, the purpose for the action, or the means by which the action was made possible; which are all argumentative roles. The direct case hides the noun's otherwise-evident argumentative role, which the verb then makes up for by conjugating with specific affixes that indicate which argumentative role the noun in the direct case has. Some Cebuano grammar teachers call the noun in the direct case the topic of the sentence, but some others call it the focus, voice, or trigger; as the verb and the other nouns in the sentence have all their noun markers and affixes change accordingly.

Cebuano has four voices:

1. the active voice a.k.a. the agent trigger
2. the passive voice for direct objects a.k.a. the patient trigger
3. the passive voice for indirect objects and/or locations a.k.a. the circumstantial trigger
4. the passive voice for instruments a.k.a. the instrument trigger.

The direct case morpheme, which marks the topic in Cebuano, is ang or si.

=== Agent trigger ===
Mo-lutò’ si Maria og kalamáy para kang Pedro.
AT-cook DIR Maria acc {type of dessert} for OBL Pedro
"Maria will cook kalamáy for Pedro."

Here, the agent/doer Maria is marked with si, the personal direct noun marker. The prefix Mo- indicates that the noun in the direct case (Maria) is also the agent/doer, which would not have been known otherwise.

=== Patient trigger ===
Luto’-on sa babaye ang bugás sa láta.
cook-PT ERG woman DIR rice OBL can
"The woman will cook the rice in the can."
(or "The rice will be cooked by the woman in the can.")

Here, the patient/object Bugás is marked with ang, the general direct noun marker. The suffix -on indicates that the noun in the direct case (bugás) is also the patient/object, which would not have been known otherwise. Babaye is marked with sa, the general indirect noun marker which indicates that babaye is not in the direct case but is still the agent/doer of the sentence. Via context and common word order, it is evident that láta is not the agent despite it being marked with sa as well (in this case, it is used as the general oblique definite noun marker). It is not the first noun in the sentence (as the agent/doer usually is) and nor can a can cook rice on its own (context).

=== Circumstantial trigger ===
The circumstantial trigger affixes select for location, benefactee and/or goal topics.

==== With location subject ====
Luto’-an sa babaye ang láta og bugás.
cook-CT ERG woman DIR can ACC rice
"The woman will cook rice in the can."
(or "The can will be cooked rice in by the woman.")

Here, the location/indirect object láta is marked with ang, the general direct noun marker. The suffix -an indicates that the noun in the direct case (láta) is also the location of the action, which would not have been known otherwise. Babaye is marked with sa, the general indirect noun marker which indicates that babaye is not in the direct case but is still the agent of the sentence. Bugás is marked with the general oblique indefinite marker og, indicating that it is neither the noun in the direct case nor the agent noun, but rather that it is the direct object of the sentence.

==== With benefactee subject ====
Luto’-an ni Maria si Pedro og kalamáy.
cook-CT ERG Maria DIR Pedro ACC {type of dessert}
"Maria will cook Pedro kalamáy."
(or "Pedro will be cooked kalamáy for by Maria.")

Here, the indirect object or benefactee Pedro is marked with si, the personal direct noun marker. The suffix -an indicates that the noun in the direct case (Pedro) is also the indirect object of the action, which would not have been known otherwise. Maria is marked with the personal indirect noun marker ni, which indicates that Maria is not the noun in the direct case but is still the agent of the sentence. Kalamáy is marked with the general oblique indefinite marker og, indicating that kalamáy is neither the noun in the direct case nor the agent/doer, but rather, it is the direct object.

==== With goal subject ====
Sulatán ni Inday si Perla og súlat.
write-CT ERG Inday DIR Perla ACC letter
"Inday will write Perla a letter."
(or "Perla will be written a letter to by Inday.")

Here, it is similar to the circumstantial trigger (with benefactee subject) in that the goal subject Perla is also the indirect object of the sentence. Perla is marked by si, the personal direct noun marker, and is known to be the indirect object of the sentence due to the verb suffix -an, which indicates that the noun in the direct case would be the indirect object of the sentence.

=== Instrument trigger ===
I-sulát ni Linda ang lapis og súlat.
IT-write ERG Linda DIR pencil ACC letter
"Linda will write a letter with the pencil."
(or "The pencil will be written a letter with by Linda.")

Here, the instrument lapis is marked with ang, the general direct noun marker. The prefix I- indicates that the noun in the direct case (lapis) is also the instrument used to complete the action, which would not have been known otherwise. Linda is marked with the personal indirect noun marker ni, which indicates that Linda is not the noun in the direct case, yet is still the agent of the sentence. Súlat is marked with the general oblique indefinite marker og, indicating that súlat is neither the noun in the direct case nor the agent/doer, but rather, it is the direct object.

To avoid ambiguity;

Súlat - is a noun which refers to the word letter.

Sulát - is a verb which means to write.

== Pronouns ==
=== Personal pronouns ===
Pronouns are inflected for person, number and case. Just like most Philippine languages, Cebuano has no gender-specific pronouns. There are no gender distinctions that are made for the third person singular: he, she, and they (singular) are all translated in Cebuano as siyá.

The three cases are direct, indirect, and oblique. The noun markers and pronouns follow their own particular set of rules for syntax and grammar.

The indirect case also functions as a genitive.

- Postposed meaning it comes after the noun: irô nakò (my dog).
- Preposed meaning it comes before the noun: akóng irô (my dog).

Cebuano personal pronouns
| | | | Direct | | Indirect (postposed) | | Indirect (preposed) | Oblique (Note: Sa + the indirect form can be used to replace these forms. For example, "Gihatag nakò kaní sa iya" vs "Gihatag nakò kani kaniya") | |
| | | | Full | Short | Full | Short | Full | Full | Short |
|---|---|---|---|---|---|---|---|---|---|
| 1st person | singular | | akó | ko | nakò | ko (Note: Ta only when the object is in the second person singular, i.e., ka, mo, etc. For example, Nakità taká, NOT *Nakità ko ka. Ti can be used in place of ta only when the second person singular object is in the direct case, i.e. ka. For example, Gihigugma tiká or Gihigugma taká, NOT *Gihigugma ko ka.) | ako, akoa | kanakò | nakò |
| 1st person | plural | exclusive | kamí | mi | namò | | amò, amoa | kanamò | namò |
| 1st person | plural | inclusive | kitá | ta | natò | ta | ato, atoa | kanatò | natò |
| 2nd person | singular | | ikáw | ka | nimo | mo | imo, imoha | kanimo | nimo |
| 2nd person | plural | | kamó | mo | ninyo | | inyo, inyoha | kaninyo | ninyo |
| 3rd person | singular | | siyá | syá | niya | | iya, iyaha | kaniya | niya |
| 3rd person | plural | | silá | | nila | | ila, ilaha | kanila | nila |

For some pronouns, singular "ko" turns to "ta" ko ka > taka 'from me to you (singular)', and ko kamo > tamo 'from me to you (plural)'.

==== Usage of full and short forms ====
The short forms are used most often in conversation. However, the full forms must be used when they occur on their own as a predicate.

Examples (Those marked with an asterisk, "*", are ungrammatical):

Akó si Juan.
*Ko si Juan.
I am John.

Kamó'y moadto ngadto sa Banawa.
*Mo'y moadto ngadto sa Banawa.
You (plu.) are going to Banawa.

But...

Akó si Juan.
Akó mao'y moadto ngadto sa Banawa.

==== First person plural: clusivity ====
In Cebuano, like most other Austronesian languages, the first person plural forms encode clusivity. This distinction, not found in most European languages, signifies whether or not the addressee is included.

Moadto mi sa eskuwelahan.
We (someone else and I but not you) will go to school.

Moadto ta sa eskuwelahan.
We (you and I and perhaps someone else) will go to school.

== Demonstratives ==
Cebuano demonstratives are as follows:

Cebuano demonstratives
| | Direct (Note: When the demonstrative is used as a predicate, the full form must be used.) | | Indirect | | Oblique (Note: These forms are already considered archaic and are commonly replaced by the indirect forms.) | Allative | Locative |
| | Full | Short | Full | Short | Oblique | Allative | Locative |
|---|---|---|---|---|---|---|---|
| Proximal (very near speaker) | kirí karí | ri | niíri niári | íri ári | kan-íri^{†} kan-ári^{†} | ngarí | dirí diári |
| Medioproximal (near speaker) | kiní kaní | ni | niíni niáni | íni áni | kan-íni^{†} kan-áni^{†} | nganhi | dinhi |
| Medial (Note: Although not represented in the orthography, forms in this row end with a glottal stop: kanâ /kaˈnaˀ/, nà /naˀ/, niˈanà /ˈniˀanaˀ/, anà /ˀanaˀ/, kan-anà /kanˀanaˀ/, nganhà /ˈŋanhaˀ/, dinhâ /dinˈhaˀ/, dihâ /diˈhaˀ/.) (near addressee) | kanâ | nà | niánà | ánà | kan-ánà^{†} | nganhà | dinhà dihâ |
| Distal (remote) | kadtó kató (Note: Contraction) | to | niádto niáto | ádto | kan-ádto^{†} | ngadto | didto |

Unsa kiní/ni?
What's this?

Kinsa kanâ/nà?
Who is that?

Kiníng sulata gikan sa Presidente sa Pilipinas.
This letter is from the President of the Philippines

Mangaon sila didtó.
They will eat there.

Nangaon kadtóng/tong mga tawo ug mga batà didtó sa piyesta/pista.
Those people and children ate at the feast.

== Adverbs ==
=== Deictics ===
Deictics, words such as here and there, reference locations between the speaker and addressee. In addition to the same four-way distinction of proximity for demonstratives (near speaker, near speaker and addressee, near addressee and remote), deictics can express three tenses:

- Present: "X is here/there now"
- Past: "X was here/there"
- Future: "X will be here/there"

The present and future tense forms can precede or follow the words or phrases they modify by linking with nga. The past tense forms, however, only have a past meaning if they precede their words or phrases. If they follow, they convey no tense.

The allative forms are always tenseless. They follow the words or phrases they modify and can substitute equivalent past forms. In addition, they show movement or motion to the relative location which past forms cannot.

Cebuano deictics
| | Present | Past | Future | Allative |
|---|---|---|---|---|
| Proximal | día adía | dirí | arí | ngarí |
| Mesioproximal | nía anía | dinhi | anhi | nganhi |
| Mesiodistal (Note: Forms in this row end in a glottal stop, except for naa and anaa: dihâ /diˈhaʔ/, dinhâ /ˈdinhaʔ/, anhà /ˈʔanhaʔ/, nganhà /ˈŋanhaʔ/.) | náa anáa | dihâ dinhà | anhà | nganhà |
| Distal | túa atúa | didto | adto | ngadto |

Día dirí ang batà.
The child is over here.

Túa si lolo sa Amerika.
Grandfather is in America.

Dinhi ang Doktor gahapon.
The doctor was here yesterday.

Moádto siyá sa Manilà.
She will be going to Manila.

Midagan ang batà ngadto sa baláy niya.
The child ran to his/her house.

== Nouns ==
Cebuano nouns fall into of two classes: personal and general. Personal nouns refer to persons or personified objects and animals and names. All other nouns fall into the general category. Nouns do not inflect for case or number: Case is shown using case markers; the plural number is show with the particle mga.

=== Case ===
Cebuano nouns assume three cases based on their role in a sentence:

- Direct – This is the case of focus or topic. This case is used in both actor-focus and non-actor focus verb forms. This case follows the Austronesian alignment. The verb partly conjugates according to the argumentative role inherit within the noun that is marked by this case.
- Indirect – This is the case of the actor/agent/doer in non-actor focus verb forms. This is also the case of possession/ownership and works similar to the genitive case.
- Oblique – A peripheral case; this is the case of the indirect object, the direct object, and/or the instrument in both actor-focus verb sentences and non-actor focus verb sentences, when the noun it modifies is also not the focus/topic. It is used to mention anything beyond the topic or focus other than the indirect case that might still be important for context and communication. Simply put, it is to mark any noun that is neither the actor/agent/doer nor the topic/focus of the sentence.

Cebuano case markers
| Class | | | Direct | Indirect | Oblique |
|---|---|---|---|---|---|
| General | Singular | Definite | ang | sa | |
| General | Singular | Indefinite | –y^{†}, ing*, i* | og | |
| General | Plural | Definite | ang mga | sa mga | |
| General | Plural | Indefinite | –y mga^{†}, ing mga*, i mga* | og mga | |
| Personal | Singular | | si | ni | kang |
| Personal | Plural | | sa* | na* | ka* |
| Personal | Plural | | silá ni | níla ni | (kan)íla ni |

*Archaic.
^{†}For example, "Siláy niadto" or "Unsay atò?".

The use of sa vs. og in the indirect and oblique case is a matter of definiteness when the noun is the object of an actor-focus verb. Compare the following examples.

1. [Definite] Mipalít si Juan sa sakyanán. John bought the car.
2. [Indefinite] Mipalít si Juan og sakyanán. John bought a car.

In example sentence 1, the car that John bought is particular. It may have been a car he was thinking about buying or one that the speaker was selling John. In 2, the speaker may or may not know the specifics about the car in question.

Sa and og can both be used for the roles of the genitive case, but only sa can be used for the actor or agent case. Og is used for adverbs as well.

=== Number ===
Plurality is shown by preceding the noun with the particle mga /maŋa/.

There are special cases though:

1. Adding the prefix ka- and the suffix -an can pluralize a noun (the suffix -han is used if the root word ends with a vowel). This word treatment is used to group what are considered identical objects as one entity. Examples are:

- libot, which is regularly used as a verb meaning to go around but in this case is used as a noun meaning "surrounding" (as in palibot), can be changed to kalibotan, which means "world" (or 'the entire surroundings').
- tawo, which means "man" or "person", can be changed to katawhan, which means "men" or "people". The vowel "o" is omitted in this case because the "w" carries the sound of "o" by itself.
- baláy (house): kabalayán (houses)
- batà (child/boy/girl): kabataan. The suffix used here is -an instead of -han since batà /bataʔ/ ends in a glottal stop.
- "nasud" (nation): "kanasuran" (nations). The "d" changed to "r" because that usually (not always) happens to "d" when placed between two vowels, though in Cebuano, d and r are not allophones, unlike in other Philippine languages.

Although it is tolerable in some cases, the use of mga before a noun applied with ka- -an is not necessary anymore. ang mga kabata-an (the children) is considered redundant, and ang kabata-an is more grammatically accurate.

Because the use of ka- -an groups objects into one entity, there are cases that a word will mean a place of which the objects are frequently or usually found/exist. An example is:

- kasagingán (from the root word saging (banana)) does not mean "bananas". Instead, it means 'a place of bananas' or simply "banana farm".

2. There is this very rare case in which an adjective can be pluralized, and the noun it describes can be, but is not necessarily, omitted. Example: the word gamáy (small) can be changed to gagmay (small ones), in which "g" was inserted in between the first and second syllable. The same rule can be applied to dakô, which means 'big', changing it to dagkò (big ones). Other examples are:

- taás (long): tag-as (long ones)
- mubô (short): mugbò (short ones)
- layô (far): lagyò (far ones)
- duól (near): dug-ol (near ones)
- nipís (thin): nigpis (thin ones)
- lapád (wide): lagpad (wide ones)

This rule cannot be applied to all other adjectives.

=== Gender ===
As a rule, Cebuano does not categorize nouns by gender. Natural gender is found in Spanish loanwords and some native words, including words with Spanish-derived gendered affixes.

| Gloss | Neutral | Masculine | Feminine |
|---|---|---|---|
| friend | higala | amigo | amiga |
| boastful | hambog | hambogero | hambogera |
| spouse | kapikas | bana | asawa |

== Adjectives ==
=== Plural forms ===
Adjectives do not inflect for the plural. Common adjectives of measurement, however, have a plural form characterized by the infixation of /g/.

| Gloss | Singular | Plural |
|---|---|---|
| small | gamáy | gagmay |
| big | dakô | dagkò |
| near | duól | dug-ol |
| far | layô | lagyò |
| short | mubô | mugbò |
| tall | taás | tag-as |
| thin | nipís | nigpis |
| thick | bagâ | baggà |
| narrow | piót | pig-ot |
| wide | lapád | lagpad |

=== Comparative ===
In comparing two similar items, the comparative form indicates that one has a higher degree (or lower degree) of the quality expressed by the root, e.g., bigger, smaller, greater, etc.

The comparative degree is expressed in the following ways:

- Precede the adjective with labí pa ("more [still]")
- Precede the adjective with the particle mas (from Spanish más)

dakô big
| Method | Form | Gloss |
|---|---|---|
| labí pa | labí pang dakô | bigger |
| mas | mas dakô | bigger |

=== Comparative superlative ===
The comparative superlative indicates the maximum degree of the quality expressed in comparison to other items. In Cebuano this degree can be expressed by a circumfix, kina- -an or by the use of the particle labí (most). The prefix pinaká- is also used.

dakô big
| Method | Form | Gloss |
|---|---|---|
| kina- -an | kinadak-an | biggest |
| labí | labíng dakô | biggest |
| pinaká- | pinakadakô | biggest |

=== Absolute superlative ===
The absolute superlative is the form used in exclamations, for example, "How pretty you are!", and denote the extreme quality of the root.

It is formed by prefixing pagká- or ka- (short form) to the root. The subject follows in the indirect.

Examples:

Pagkanindot nianà! (Full)
Kanindot anà! (Short)
How great that is! That is amazing!

=== Intensive ===
To express intensity, adjectives are followed by kaayo (very).

Examples:

Ang mga duwende mugbò kaayo.
Dwarves are very short.

== Linkers ==
=== Nga ===
The linker nga (pronounced /ŋa/) shows the relationship between modifiers to the head of the phrase. Examples of such relationships are adjective–noun, clause–noun, adverb–verb, adverb–adjective and noun–noun. Without the intervening linker, juxtaposition of modifier and head can constitute, not a phrase, but a sentence unto itself. Compare the phrase ang batang lalaki ("the/a young man/boy") and the sentence ang batà lalaki ("the child is male" or "the child is a boy").

After words that end in a monophthong, diphthong or -n, nga is optionally reduced to the suffix -ng /-ŋ/.

Unlike Tagalog, which uses the linker na for all modifiers, including numbers, the Cebuano linker nga is not used with numbers; ka, as shown below, is used instead.

| Example | Gloss |
|---|---|
| baláy nga bató baláyng bató | stone house |
| baláy nga nipà baláyng nipà | nipa hut |
| baláy nga kahoy baláyng kahoy | wooden house |
| dakô nga baláy dakóng baláy | big house |
| gamáy nga baláy gamáyng baláy | small house |

=== Ka ===
The linker ka is used to link a number and the phrase it modifies. Buók (whole) is sometimes used with ka.

| Example 1 | Example 2 | Gloss |
|---|---|---|
| usá ka batà | usá ka buók batà | one child |
| waló ka semana | waló ka buók semana | eight weeks |
| duhá ka tasà | duhá ka buók tasà | two cups |

== Enclitic particles ==
Cebuano uses a lot of particles that could change the intended meaning or expression of a sentence. Here is a list of particles used in day-to-day conversation:

1. na: references a past situation to the present
  - (in positive statements): now, already
    aduna na/naa na — it now exists
    (nuance: it didn't exist before)
  - (in negative statements): anymore
    walâ na — it doesn't exist anymore
    (nuance: it existed before)
2. pa: references a future situation to the present
  - (in positive statements): still
    aduna pa/naa pa — it still exists
    (nuance: it will not exist sometime after)
  - (in negative statements): yet
    walâ pa — it doesn't exist yet
    (nuance: it will exist sometime after)
3. ba: used for yes-and-no questions and optionally for other types of questions.
4. ra/da and lang/lamanɡ: limiting particle; just, only.
5. gyud/gayúd, bitáw, lagí, ganì: indeed; used in affirmations or emphasis.
6. usáb, upód: also, too
7. man, ugód: expresses (new) information, or contradicts a previous statement
8. uróy: corrects a (supposed) misconception
  person 1: walâ pa ka mahumán? — aren't you done yet?
  person 2: humán na uróy! — I am!
9. bayâ: expresses admonition; watch out
  mamaak bayâ na'ng iroa — watch out! that dog bites
10. diáy: indicates that the speaker has received new information
11. dà:
  - (initial in a clause): there, I told you so!
    dà, nasamad hinuon — I told you! now you've hurt yourself
  - (ending a clause): expresses sudden, unexpected, or unwanted emotion; as when remembering something forgotten
    gitugnaw ko dà! — I feel cold! (nuance: I didn't expect to become cold)
12. kunó, daw: indicates second-hand information; he said, it is said, reportedly, allegedly, etc.
13. guro/siguro, tingalì: expresses uncertainty; probably, maybe
14. kahâ/kayhâ: expresses wonder; I wonder, perhaps
15. untà, maytà (short for "maayo untà"): expresses hope; I hope
16. kay: indicates cause; because.
  - also used as a linking word in sentences with Subject-Predicate structure (compare "is/was/be" in English)
    si Maria kay nabuntis — Maria was pregnant
17. maó: (it/he/she) is/was/will be the one...
  si Maria maó'y nabuntis — it was Maria who got pregnant
18. ganì: even
19. bisan: even though, even if, although
20. hinuon (shortened to "nuon"): instead, however, rather; as a result
21. usâ: for now, for the time being
22. intawon: expresses pity
23. puhón: God willing, in the future

The following are particles that are usually only found at the end of a sentence:

1. ha: asks listener if they understand, or if they agree
  dilì ni sabunán, ha? — don’t wash this with soap, do you understand?
2. no, sa (from "unsá" meaning "what?"): asks to clarify; isn't that right?
  - (with prior knowledge, confirmation): no
    dilì ka moinóm, no? — you don't drink liquor, do you?
    (nuance: the speaker knew beforehand that the person doesn't drink)
  - (without prior knowledge, assumption): sa
    dilì ka moinóm, sa? — you don't drink liquor, do you?
    (nuance: the speaker didn't know beforehand that the person doesn't drink)
3. ay: follows a word to call someone's attention to it
  tua sa iskina ay! — it’s right there at the corner!
4. uy/oy:
  - expresses annoyance
  - expresses surprise upon discovering something

These particles can be paired with one or more particles to form a more specific meaning. One exception is with na and pa, which cannot be used in the same sentence.

1. maó + ra + og = murág: like, seemingly
2. maó + gyud/bitáw/lagí/ganì: that is so; strongly affirming a statement
3. maó + ra + pud + nuon: that’s the only thing that’s wrong with it
4. ba + gud: expresses disbelief; how is it possible that (so-and-so) should happen?
5. na + lang: now it is only (so-and-so much) when it was more before; (so-and-so) will do it, though it should not be so
6. pa + lang: (such-and-such) was the first; lest (so-and-so) happen; if (so-and-so) had been the case
7. etc.

== Interrogatives ==
- Unsá? What?
- Asa? Where? (esp. for a place or person)
- Diín?, Dis-a? Where? (esp. for past occurrence)
- Hain?, Saa/Asa? Where? (esp. for an object)
- Kinsa? Who?
- Kang kinsa? To whom?
- Ngano? Why?
- Giunsa? How? (past)
- Unsaon? How? (future)
- Kanus-a? When?
- Pila (ka buok)? How many?
- Tagpila? How much?
- Ikapila? What order?
- Di-ay ba? Really?

The words asa, diín, and hain can be used interchangeably in everyday speech. Although their use is distinguished in formal contexts:

Asa is used when asking about a place.

- Asa ka padulóng? (Where are you going?)
- Asa ta molarga? (Where are we traveling to?)

Hain is used when asking about the location of a thing.

- Hain ang gunting? (Where is the pair of scissors?)
- Hain na ang pagka-on sa pista? (Where is the food for the festival)

It is worth noting that in spoken Cebuano, asa has slowly become the main word for where. In fact, hain, except by older generations, is rarely used.

== Verbs ==
Verbs in Cebuano conjugate according to several factors: to divulge/agree with the argumentative role that the noun marked by the direct case has; the voice; the form; the mood; and the aspect/tense of the sentence.

=== Verb roots vs. verb stems ===
A verb root is the simplest version of a verb that conveys its overall meaning or lemma and cannot be broken down any further (excluding morphological processes and colloquial speech).

The affixes that are used to altogether describe the argumentative role, the voice, the form, the mood, and the aspect/tense cannot be added to the verb root, only to the verb stem.

The verb stem may be created through the addition of certain affixes that are not related to the affixes used to altogether describe the argumentative role, the voice, the form, the mood, and the aspect/tense of the sentence. Sometimes, the verb stem is identical to the verb root.

A commonly known verb stem affix is the prefix pa-, added to the beginning of a verb root (and sometimes, other verb stems) in order to convey the meaning of to cause. For example, padalá is a verb stem that has the meaning of to send, while dalá is its own verb root and verb stem, meaning to bring. Concluding that padalá could literally mean to cause to bring. Another commonly known affix is the prefix hi- which is added to verb roots/stems in the stative form so that the verb may take in a direct object, as verbs in the stative form are not able to take a direct object without it.

=== The moods, forms, and aspects/tenses ===
Verbs in Cebuano not only conjugate according to the argumentative role of the noun that is marked by the direct case, but also according to the voice, the form, the mood, and the aspect/tense of the sentence. Cebuano verbs conjugate accordingly through the use of affixes on the verb stem.

=== Mood ===
There are three moods that the verbal affixes may pertain to in the Cebuano language. The three moods are:

==== The indicative mood ====
This is the default mood of verbs in which the action is most commonly described. This mood does have imperative aspects in only some certain forms.

==== The mirative mood ====
This is the mood where the action is unexpected or unintended. There is no imperative aspect for this mood. This mood is used differently in Cebuano than its usual use, see mirative mood. Some may describe this mood as dubitative or subjunctive.

==== The potential mood ====
This is the mood where the action is able to happen or allowed to happen. This mood may also be used to convey a statement or general possibility. There is no imperative aspect for this mood.

The prefixes naka- and maka- (mostly used for this mood) may be shortened to ka- in colloquial speech and in colloquial writing, which gets rid of the aspect/tense found within these prefixes. Similarly, the prefixes naga- and maga- are colloquially shortened to ga-, however, ga- is usually considered as past and/or strictly present tense.

=== Form ===
There are four forms that the verbal affixes may pertain to in the Cebuano language. The four forms are:

==== The punctual form ====
Expresses an action viewed as a whole, one that was, is, will, or would be instantly completed. The affixes in this form may hint at a sort of intention or will to do the action/verb. This is also the form where the action may just be a statement. See perfective aspect.
Examples:

- Nikuha siya og saging - He/she took a banana
- Mokaon ko og saging - I will eat a banana/I eat bananas

==== The durative form ====
Expresses an action as taking place over a period of time. As with the punctual forms, these affixes also hint at a sort of intention or will to do the action/verb. See imperfective aspect.
Examples:

- Nagkuha/nanguha siya og saging pag-abot nimo - He was taking a banana when you arrived
- Nagkaon ko og saging pagkuha niya - I was eating a banana when he/she took (it)

==== The stative form ====
This is the form where the action expresses the state of being, condition, and/or emotion of a subject/object. Affixes of this form may give a nuance of involuntary action, those done without intention but by chance.
Examples:

- Nakuha niya ang saging - The banana was caught by him/her
- Nakaon nako ang panit sa saging - I unwillingly ate the banana peel

==== The reciprocal form ====
This is the form where the action is being reciprocated between two persons/things to each other.
Examples:

- Nagkuhaay sila og saging - They took bananas together
- Nagkan-anay (nagkaonay) sila - They ate each other

=== Tense vs. aspect ===
Cebuano generally does not use tense, rather it uses aspect. Cebuano verbs conjugate according to a voice, a mood, a form, and an aspect. According to the functionalist school of grammar, there are two aspects: the nasugdan (incepted [past/present inchoative]) aspect and the pagasugdan (incepting [future/habitual inchoative]) aspect. They claim that Cebuano verbs feature the aspects of inception; that is whether the action has been initiated or not.

The nasugdan aspect is the aspect where the action had already started in the past, while the pagasugdan aspect is the aspect where the action has not started yet. Basically, past and present actions are in the nasugdan aspect while future actions and habitual actions are in the pagasugdan aspect. Although habitual actions started in the past, they have yet to start again. Hence, they are in the pagasugdan aspect.

The imperatibo (imperative/command) mood is commonly grouped together with these aspects (and not with the other moods) because there are multiple imperatives of the same verb that exist according to which form is in use.

In Cebuano, verbs may also conjugate for or to agree with negatibo (negative) sentences. However, the verb itself is not negative, it just agrees with the negative words wala and dili through the negatibo verbal affixes. Wala is used for the nasugdan aspect and dili is used for the pagasugdan aspect. Ayaw is used as the negative imperative, see prohibitive mood.

=== The verbal affixes ===
The verbal affixes that feature altogether the voice, mood, form, and aspect may overlap. Some of these affixes are shortened in speech and in informal writing.

Not all groups of affixes can be used for some verbs; some verbs may not make sense with certain groups of affixes. For example, the verb stem anhi (to come) cannot have any of the passive voices' affixes; it would not make sense with such affixes.

The only way to know which groups of affixes are able to be used for each verb stem are through memorization/experience. In addition to that, in certain verbs, the affixes take on different meanings and may overlap or replace other affixes in different forms due to historical use. For example, the verb stem buák (to break) uses the same affixes that is used in the potential mood as the affixes used for the transitory form in the indicative mood. Using the normal affixes of the transitory form in the active voice for buák would sound incorrect to native speakers. Despite all that, the way the affixes are labeled are the way they are mostly used regardless.

Some affixes may be missing from the examples.

==== Active voice affixes ====
The active voice in Cebuano (a.k.a. the agent trigger) is the voice where the topic of the sentence is the agent (a.k.a. the doer, the subject, the actor) of the sentence. The verb partly conjugates according to the fact that the agent is the topic. All active voice affixes are actually prefixes.

The intentional form (Verb stem used: adto)
| Aspect/Mood | Indicative | Mirative | Potential |
|---|---|---|---|
| nasugdan | ni- or mi- | nahi- or naha- | naka- |
| nasugdan examples | Miadto ka sa tindahan. You went/go to the store. | Nahiadto ka sa tindahan. Surprisingly, you went/go to the store. | Nakaadto ka sa tindahan. You were/are able to go to the store. |
| pagasugdan | mo- | mahi- or maha- | maka- |
| pagasugdan examples | Moadto ka sa tindahan. You will go to the store. | Mahiadto ka sa tindahan. Surprisingly, you will go to the store. | Makaadto ka sa tindahan. You will be able to go to the store. |
| negatibo | mo- | mahi- or maha- | maka- |
| negatibo examples | Walâ ka moadto sa tindahan. You did/do not go to the store. Dilì ka moadto sa tindahan. You will not go to the store. | Walâ ka mahiadto sa tindahan. Surprisingly, you did/do not go to the store. Dilì ka mahiadto sa tindahan. Surprisingly, you will not go to the store. | Walâ ka makaadto sa tindahan. You were/are not able to go to the store. Dilì ka makaadto sa tindahan. You will not be able to go to the store. |
| imperatibo | (Verb Stem) or optionally: pag- | (none) | (none) |
| imperatibo examples | Adto (ka) sa tindahan! (You,) Go to the store! | --- | --- |

These affixes not only have the essence that they are instantaneous, but they also have the essence of intention; that the topic willed for it to happen. It also has the essence of motion or movement. The prefix mi- is more formal than ni-; otherwise, they are interchangeable. It is common to use pag- because it is a common imperative affix in the active voice in Cebuano.

With verb stems like adto, mo- may sometimes be used as the nasugdan aspect because although it started in the past and may still be going on, the destination may not have been reached yet. Adto also means to go, and when used in the present tense, it is understandable that it may use mo- for a nasugdan aspect.

The durative form (Verb stem used: kaon)
| Aspect/Mood | Indicative | Mirative | Potential |
|---|---|---|---|
| nasugdan | nag- or naga- | nahi- or naha- | naka- |
| nasugdan examples | Nagkaón siya sa Jollibee, He/She was/is eating at Jollibee. | Nahikaón siyá sa Jollibee. Surprisingly, he/she was/is eating at Jollibee. | Nakakaón siyá sa Jollibee. He/She was/is able to eat at Jollibee. |
| pagasugdan | mag- or maga- | mahi- or maha- | maka- |
| pagasugdan examples | Magkaón siya sa Jollibee. He/She will be eating at Jollibee. | Mahikaón siyá sa Jollibee. Surprisingly, he/she will be eating at Jollibee. | Makakaón siyá sa Jollibee. He/She will be able to eat at Jollibee. |
| negatibo | mag- | mahi- or maha- | maka- |
| negatibo examples | Walâ siyá magkaón sa Jollibee. He/She was/is not eating at Jollibee. Dilì siyá magkaón sa Jollibee. He/She will not be eating at Jollibee. | Walâ siyá mahikaón sa Jollibee. Surprisingly, he/she was/is not eating at Jollibee. Dilì siyá mahikaón sa Jollibee. Surprisingly, he/she will not be eating at Jollibee. | Walâ siyá makakaón sa Jollibee. He/She was/is not able to eat at Jollibee. Dilì siyá makakaon sa Jollibee. He/She will not be able to eat at Jollibee. |
| imperatibo | pag- | (none) | (none) |
| imperatibo examples | Pagkaón (ka) sa Jollibee! (You,) Eat at Jollibee! | --- | --- |
| nasugdan plural | nang- | nahipang- or nahapang- | nakapang- |
| nasugdan plural examples | *Nangaon silá sa Jollibee. They were/are eating at Jollibee. | Nahipangaon silá sa Jollibee. Surprisingly, they were/are eating at Jollibee. | Nakapangaon silá sa Jollibee. They were/are able to eat at Jollibee. |
| pagasugdan plural | mang- | mahipang- or mahapang- | makapang- |
| pagasugdan plural examples | *Mangaon silá sa Jollibee. They will be eating at Jollibee. | Mahipangaon silá sa Jollibee. Surprisingly, they will be eating at Jollibee. | Makapangaon silá sa Jollibee. They will be able to eat at Jollibee. |
| negatibo plural | mang- | mahipang- or mahapang- | makapang- |
| negatibo plural examples | Walâ silá mangaon sa Jollibee. They were/are not eating at Jollibee. Dilì silá mangaon sa Jollibee. They will not be eating at Jollibee. | Walâ silá mahipangaon sa Jollibee. Surprisingly, they were/are not eating at Jollibee. Dilì silá mahipangaon sa Jollibee. Surprisingly, they will not be eating at Jollibee. | Walâ silá makapangaon sa Jollibee. They were/are not able to eat at Jollibee. Dilì silá makapangaon sa Jollibee. They will not be able to eat at Jollibee. |
| imperatibo plural | pang- | (none) | (none) |
| imperatibo plural examples | *Pangaon (kamo) sa Jollibee! (You all,) Eat at Jollibee! | --- | --- |

The prefixes naga- and maga- may be shortened to ga- in colloquial speech and in colloquial writing, which may indicate a lack of aspect but it still preserves the form. Some argue that the difference between nag- and mag- versus naga- and maga- are either in formality (naga- and maga- being more formal) or in tense (naga- being more in the present and nag- being more in the past, while maga- and mag- are interchangeable).

The prefixes naka- and maka- may be shortened to ka- in colloquial speech and in colloquial writing, which may get rid of the aspect within the prefixes. This could be similar to naga- and maga- being shortened to ga-.

Plurality depends on whether the topic is a plural noun. The topic may be the subject, the object, etc., however, because this is the active voice, the topic should always be the Subject with these plural affixes. As long as the subjects are plural, the plural version is usually used, but this is not always mandatory. Some verbs only use the plural version while other verbs are rarely used in their plural versions.

* The "ng" in nang- and mang- may change to "m" or "n" or delete the next consonant depending on the succeeding consonant. Refer to the Morphological Process of Assimilation in Cebuano for more information.

Sometimes pang- is used as the plural version of the imperatibo mood.

The stative form (Verb stem used: higugma)
| Aspect/Mood | Indicative | Mirative |
|---|---|---|
| nasugdan | na- | naha-/nahi- |
| nasugdan examples | Nahigugma akó kanimo. I was/am in love with you. | Nahahigugma akó kanimo. Surprisingly, I was/am in love with you. |
| pagasugdan | ma- | maha-/mahi- |
| pagasugdan examples | Mahigugma akó kanimo. I will be in love with you. | Mahahigugma akó kanimo. Surprisingly, I will be in love with you. |
| negatibo | ma- | maha-/mahi- |
| negatibo examples | Walâ akó mahigugma kanimo. I was/am not in love with you. Dilì ako mahigugma kanimo. I will not be in love with you. | Walâ akó mahahigugma kanimo. Surprisingly, I was/am not in love with you. Dilì akó mahahigugma kanimo. Surprisingly, I will not be in love with you. |
| imperatibo | ka- | (none) |
| imperatibo examples | Kahigugma (ka)! (You,) Be in love! | --- |
| nasugdan | nagka- | (none) |
| nasugdan examples | Nagkahigugma akó kanimo. I was/am falling in love with you. | --- |
| pagasugdan | magka- | (none) |
| pagasugdan examples | Magkahigugma akó kanimo. I will be falling in love with you. | --- |
| negatibo | magka- | (none) |
| negatibo examples | Walâ akó magkahigugma kanimo. I was/am not falling in love with you. Dilì akó magkahigugma kanimo. I will not be falling in love with you. | --- |
| imperatibo | pagka- | (none) |
| imperatibo examples | Pagkahigugma (kamo)! (You all,) Fall in love! | --- |

the stative form does not have a potential mood. The hi- prefix before gugma is necessary for the verb to take in a direct object, so the "imperatibo examples" would imply a direct object. The nagka- and magka- prefixes are different from the na- and ma- in that they have the essence of a slowly but surely, or steady, change that is occurring within the topic. They are not used as often anymore, so the same essence may be achieved with the na- and ma- prefixes nowadays. However, pagka- just has more emphasis than ka- may have, and pagka- is still commonly used today. The mirative mood with the nagka- and magka- prefixes is no longer known nor used. The plural prefixes nang- and mang- become nanga- and manga- if the verb also includes these prefixes: na-, ma-, and ka-. For example, "Nangahigugma kami kanimo," which means "We love you."

The reciprocal form (Verb stem used: hatag)
| Aspect/Mood | Indicative | Mirative |
|---|---|---|
| nasugdan | nag-(first letter of verb stem)-in-(the rest of the verb stem)-ay | nagka-(first letter of verb stem)-in-(the rest of the verb stem)-ay |
| nasugdan examples | Naghinatagáy ang babaye ug (ang) iyáng bana sa mga halók. The woman and her husband gave/give each other kisses. | Nagkahinatagáy ang babaye ug (ang) iyáng bana sa mga halók. Surprisingly, the woman and her husband gave/give each other kisses. |
| pagasugdan | mag-(first letter of verb stem)-in-(the rest of the verb stem)-ay | magka-(first letter of verb stem)-in-(the rest of the verb stem)-ay |
| pagasugdan examples | Maghinatagáy ang babaye ug (ang) iyáng bana sa mga halók. The woman and her husband will give each other kisses. | Magkahinatagáy ang babaye ug (ang) iyáng bana sa mga halók. Surprisingly, the woman and her husband will give each other kisses. |
| negatibo | mag-(first letter of verb stem)-in-(the rest of the verb stem)-ay | magka-(first letter of verb stem)-in-(the rest of the verb stem)-ay |
| negatibo examples | Walâ maghinatagáy ang babaye ug (ang) iyáng bana sa mga halók. The woman and her husband did/do not give each other kisses. Dilì maghinatagáy ang babaye ug (ang) iyáng bana sa mga halók. The woman and her husband will not give each other kisses. | Walâ magkahinatagáy ang babaye ug (ang) iyáng bana sa mga halók. Surprisingly, he woman and her husband did/do not give each other kisses. Dilì magkahinatagáy ang babaye ug (ang) iyáng bana sa mga halók. Surprisingly, the woman and her husband will not give each other kisses. |
| imperatibo | pag-(first letter of verb stem)-in-(the rest of the verb stem)-ay | (none) |
| imperatibo examples | Paghinatagáy sa mga halók! Give each other kisses! | --- |

The reciprocal form does not have a potential mood. This form is not in common use anymore.

==== Passive voice for direct objects affixes ====
The passive voice for direct objects in Cebuano (a.k.a. the patient trigger) is the voice where the topic of the sentence is the direct object (a.k.a. the patient, the goal, etc.) of the sentence. Hence, the verb partly conjugates accordingly.

The intentional and durative form(s) (Verb stem used: inom)
| Aspect/Mood | Indicative | Mirative & Potential |
|---|---|---|
| nasugdan | gi- | na- |
| nasugdan examples | Giinóm nakò ang tubig. The water was/is being drunk by me. | Nainóm nakò ang tubig. Surprisingly, the water was/is being drunk by me. or I was/am able to drink the water. |
| pagasugdan | -on | ma- |
| pagasugdan examples | *Imnon nakò ang tubig. The water will be drunk by me. | Mainóm nakò ang tubig. Surprisingly, the water will be drunk by me. or I will be able to drink the water. |
| negatibo | nasugdan: gi- or -a pagasugdan: -on | ma- |
| negatibo examples | Walâ nakò giinóm ang tubig. The water was/is not being drunk by me. Walâ nakò imna ang tubig. The water was/is not being drunk by me. Dilì nakò imnon ang tubig. The water will not be drunk by me. | Walâ nakò mainóm ang tubig. Surprisingly, the water was/is not being drunk by me. or I was/am not able to drink the water. Dilì nakò mainóm ang tubig. Surprisingly, the water will not be drunk by me. or I will not be able to drink the water. |
| imperatibo | -a | (none) |
| imperatibo examples | *Imna (nimo) ang tubig! (You,) Drink the water! | --- |

* Imnon and Imna went through some of the morphological processes in Cebuano. The mirative and potential moods are the same for these forms of affixes. In the "negatibo aspect," the indirect personal pronouns are usually put before the verb. A noun in the indirect case, or a proper noun in the indirect case, would both be put after the verb. For example, "Dilì imnon sa iríng ang gatas." which means "The milk will not be drunk by the cat."

==== Passive voice for indirect objects affixes ====
The passive voice for indirect objects in Cebuano (a.k.a. the circumstantial triggers) is the voice where the topic of the sentence is the indirect object (a.k.a. the benefactee, the location, the goal, etc.) of the sentence. Hence, the verb partly conjugates accordingly.

The intentional and durative form(s) (Verb stem used: kuha)
| Aspect/Mood | Indicative | Mirative | Potential |
|---|---|---|---|
| nasugdan | gi-(verb stem)-an | hing-(verb stem)-an or nahi-(verb stem)-an or naha-(verb stem)-an | na-(verb stem)-an |
| nasugdan examples | Gikuhaan nimo ang irô og regalo. You got/get a gift for the dog. | Hinguhaan nimo ang irô og regalo. Surprisingly, you got/get a gift for the dog. | Nakuhaan nimo ang irô og regalo. You were/are able to get a gift for the dog. |
| pagasugdan | -an | mahi-(verb stem)-an or maha-(verb stem)-an | ma-(verb stem)-an |
| pagasugdan examples | Kuhaan nimo ang irô og regalo. You will get a gift for the dog. | Mahikuhaan nimo ang iro og regalo. Surprisingly, you will get a gift for the dog. | Makuhaan nimo ang irô og regalo. You will be able to get a gift for the dog. |
| negatibo | -i | hing-(verb stem)-i | ma-(verb stem)-i |
| negatibo examples | Walâ nimo kuhai ang irô og regalo. You did/do not get a gift for the dog. Dilì nimo kuhai ang irô og regalo. You will not get a gift for the dog. | Walâ nimo hinguhai ang irô og regalo. Surprisingly, you did/do not get a gift for the dog. Dilì nimo hinguhai ang irô og regalo. Surprisingly, you will not get a gift for the dog. | Walâ nimo makuhai ang irô og regalo. You were/are not able to get a gift for the dog. Dilì nimo makuhai ang irô og regalo. You will not be able to get a gift for the dog. |
| imperatibo | -i | (none) | (none) |
| imperatibo examples | Kuhai (nimo) ang irô og regalo! (You,) Get a gift for the dog! | --- | --- |

In the examples, the topic is the dog (the indirect object) and it is used as the topic to emphasize that the dog got the gift, nothing else. In context, a person may say this to you when you are confused about whom/what you should get the gift for. Perhaps there is a cat and a dog and the person clarifies that you got/get/will get/should get a gift for the dog (and not the cat).

==== Passive voice for instruments affixes ====
The passive voice for instruments (a.k.a. the instrumental trigger) is the voice where the topic of the sentence is the instrument of the sentence. The instrument is the noun that is used for the action of the sentence.

The intentional and durative form(s) (Verb stem used: abli)
| Aspect/Mood | Indicative | Mirative | Potential |
|---|---|---|---|
| nasugdan | gi- | nai- | gika- |
| | Giabli natò ang yawi sa pultahán. With a key, we (including listener) opened/open the door. | Naiabli natò ang yawi sa pultahán. Surprisingly, we (including listener) opened/open the door with a key. | Gikaabli natò ang yawi sa pultahán. With a key, we (including listener) were/are able to open the door. |
| pagasugdan | i- | mai- | ika- |
| | Iabli natò ang yawi sa pultahán. With a key, we (including listener) will open the door. | Maiabli natò ang yawi sa pultahán. Surprisingly, we (including listener) will open the door with a key. | Ikaabli natò ang yawi sa pultahán. With a key, we (including listener) will be able to open the door. |
| negatibo | i- | mai- | ikaw- |
| | Walâ natò iabli ang yawi sa pultahán. With a key, we (including listener) did/do not open the door. Dilì natò iabli ang yawi sa pultahán. With a key, we (including listener) will not open the door. | Walâ natò maiabli ang yawi sa pultahán. Surprisingly, we (including listener) did/do not open the door with a key. Dilì natò maiabli ang yawi sa pultahán. Surprisingly, we (including listener) will not open the door with a key. | Walâ natò ikawabli ang yawi sa pultahán. With a key, we (including listener) were/are not able to open the door. Dilì natò ikawabli ang yawi sa pultahán. With a key, we (including listener) will not be able to open the door. |
| imperatibo | i- | (none) | (none) |
| | Iabli (natò) ang yawi sa pultahán! With a key, (let's [including listener]) open the door! | --- | --- |

The prefix gi- may also be used/confused with the intentional and durative forms's affixes in the passive voice of direct objects.

Basic Cebuano Verbal Affixes
| Trigger | Mood/Aspect | Indicative | | | Potential | |
| Trigger | Mood/Aspect | Incepted | Incepting | Imperative | Incepted | Incepting |
|---|---|---|---|---|---|---|
| Agent | Punctual | mi(ng)-, ni(ng)-, hing- | mo- | ∅ | naka- | maka- |
| Agent | Durative | nag-, ga- | mag- | pag- | naka- | maka- |
| Agent | Distributive | naN- | maN- | paN- | nakapaN- | makapaN- |
| Agent | Stative | na- | ma- | ka- | | |
| Patient | Punctual | gi- | -on | -a | na- | ma- |
| Patient | Durative | gina- | paga- -on | paga- -a | na- | ma- |
| Patient | Distributive | gipaN- | paN- -on | paN- -a | napaN- | mapaN- |
| Patient | Stative | gika- | ka- -on | ka- -a | | |
| Circumstantial | Punctual | gi- -an | -an | -i | na- -an | ma- -an |
| Circumstantial | Durative | gina- -an | paga- -an | paga- -i | na- -an | ma- -an |
| Circumstantial | Distributive | gipaN- -an | paN- -an | paN- -i | napaN- -an | mapaN- -an |
| Circumstantial | Stative | gika- -an | ka- -an | ka- -i | | |
| Instrumental | Punctual | gi- | i- | | na- | ma- |
| Instrumental | Durative | gina- | iga- | | na- | ma- |
| Instrumental | Distributive | gipaN- | ipaN- | | napaN- | mapaN- |
| Instrumental | Stative | gika- | ika- | | | |

Other Cebuano Verbal Affixes
| Voice-aspect (horizontal) Affix group (vertical) | Active nasugdan | Active pagasugdan | Active imperative | Passive nasugdan | Passive pagasugdan |
|---|---|---|---|---|---|
| maga- | naga-/nag- | maga-/mag- | paga-/pag- | gi- | i, on, an |
| iga-/ika- | | | | | iga-/ika- |
| magapa- | nagapa-/nagpa- | magapa-/magpa- | pagapá-/pagpá- | gipa- | ipa-/pa-, pagapa-/pagpa- i, on, an |
| magapaka- | nagapaka-/nagpaka- | magapaka-/magpaka- | pagapaka-/pagpaka- | gipaka- | pagapak-/pagpak-/paka- on, an |
| magaka- | nagaka-/nagka- | magaka-/magka- | pagaka-/pagka- | gika- | pagaka-/pagka- on, an |
| magahi- | nagahi-/naghi- | magahi-/maghi- | pagahi-/paghi- | gihi- | pagahi-/paghi-/hi- on, an |
| maka- | naka- | maka- | pagaka-/pagka- | gika-, na- | pagka-/ka-, ma- an |
| mo- | mi-/ni- | mo- | mo-/-um- | gi- | i, on, an |
| ma- | na- | ma- | ma-/pa-/ka- | na- | ma- an |
| manag- | nanag- | manag- | manag-/panag- | gipanag- | panag- i, on, an |
| man- | nan- | man- | man-/pan- | gipa- | pa- i, on, an |
| maki- | naki- | maki- | pagpaki- | gipaki- | ipagpaki-/ipaki- i, an |
| makíg- | nakíg- | makíg- | pagpakíg- | gipakíg- | ipagpakíg-/ipakíg- |
| mahá-/ mahí- | naha-/ nahí- | mahá-/ mahí- | pagpaha-/paha- pagpahi-/pahi- | hin- | pagpaha-/paha-/hi- pagpahi-/pahi-/hi- |
| mapa- | napa- | mapa- | pa- | | on, an |
| masig- | nasig- | masig- | pasig- | | |
| masighi- | nasighi- | masighi- | pasighi- | | |
| mangi- | nangi- | mangi- | mangi-/pangi- | gipangi- | pangi- i |
| manhi- | nanhi- | manhi- | manhi-/panhi- | gipanhi- | panhi- an |
| manig- | nanig- | manig- | pagpanig- | gipanig- | pagpanig- an |
| manum- | nanum- | manum- | | | |
| mani- | nani- | mani- | pagpani- | gipani- | pagpani-/pani- on, an |

There are over 2000 different verbs in Cebuano to choose from and to use. There are many more affixes that can be used for verb roots, verb stems, and new words.

== Negation ==
Words for negation in Cebuano acts as a verb.

| Aspect/Mood | Form | | Gloss |
| Aspect/Mood | Full | Short | Gloss |
|---|---|---|---|
| nasugdan | walâ | wà | do/did not |
| pagasugdan | dilì | dì | will not |
| imperatibo | ayáw | ay | do not! |

== Syntax ==
=== Sentences ===
1) Equational (topic = predicate) – In this sentence type, one can interchange the topic and the predicate without changing the thought of the sentence.

 a) "Maó kiní ang Kabisay-an."              = This is the Visayas.
 b) "Magbinisayâ mi diri."                  = We speak Cebuano here.
 c) "Kamaó/Kahibaló ka magbinisayâ?"        = Do you know how to speak Cebuano?

2) Non-equational (topic < predicate) – In this sentence type, the topic and the predicate are not interchangeable.

 a) "Filipino ang mga Bisayâ."              = Visayans are Filipinos.
 b) "Unsa ang imong kinahanglan?"           = What do you need?
 c) "Naunsa na ang politika?"               = How are the politics?

3) Existential sentence of presence – Sentences of this type tells the existence of a thing or idea.

 a) "Adunay Diyós sa langit."               = There is a God in heaven.
 b) "Didtoy halas sa kahoy."                = There was a snake in the tree.

4) Existential sentence of possession – Sentences of this type tell about someone or something possessing something.

 a) "Adunay Diyós ang mga anghél sa langit." = The angels in heaven have a God.
 b) "Naa[10] koy ilimnon sa baláy." = I have something to drink at home.

5) Locative sentence – This type of sentence tells the location of a thing.

 a) "Ania ang kwarta."                       = Here is the money.
 b) "Tuá siyá sa bukid."                     = He/she is on the mountain.

6) Meteorologic sentence – This type of sentence tells about weather condition, noise level, etc., of a place.

 a) "Tugnaw dinhí sa Baguio."                 = It is cold here in Baguio.
 b) "Init kaayo ang adlaw dirí sa Sugbo."     = The weather is very hot here in Cebu.

7) Exclamatory remark – Praises and unexpected discoveries belong here.

 a) "Daghana nimo'g sakyanán!"             = You have plenty of cars!
 b) "Gwapaha nimo!"                        = You are pretty!
 c) "Kasabà ba ninyo!"                     = You are so noisy!

8) Imperatives – Commands and requests.

 a) "Isugba kanáng isdà."                  = Grill that fish.
 b) "Ngarí/Alî/Halî dirí."                 = Come here.
 c) "Ayáw mo panabakô dirí."               = Do not smoke here.

9) Interrogatives – Questions that are not answerable by yes or no.

 a) "Kinsa ka?"                             = Who are you?
 b) "Unsa'y imong ngalan?"                  = What is your name?

10) Confirmation – Questions that are basically answered by yes or no. Constructed like the first six sentence types with the insertion of the particle "ba" as a second term.

 a) "Kiní ba ang Kabisay-an?"               = Is this the Visayas?
 b) "Kamao ka ba molangóy?"                 = Do you know how to swim?
 c) "Unsa ba ang sinultihán ninyo?"         = What language do you speak?
 d) "Isugba ba kining isdà?"                = Shall this fish be grilled?
