= Simplex (disambiguation) =

Simplex may refer to:

== Biology ==
- List of species named simplex, a common species name
- Herpes simplex, a viral disease caused by Herpes simplex viruses

== Companies and branded products ==
- Simplex (bicycle), a French bicycle derailleur brand
- Simplex Manufacturing Corporation, an American manufacturer of motorcycles in Louisiana from 1935 to 1975
- American Simplex, an American automobile made in Mishawaka, Indiana, US
- Simplex Automobile Company, a defunct luxury car manufacturer from 1907 to 1921
- Crane-Simplex, a defunct luxury car manufacturer in New York, US at the start of the 20th century
- Sheffield-Simplex, a British vehicle manufacturer operating 1907–1920
- Bergmann Simplex, an early 20th-century, German-made handgun
- Mercedes Simplex, an automobile model produced between 1902 and 1909
- Simplex Typewriter Company, an index typewriter manufacturer
- A trade name used by British railway locomotive manufacturers The Motor Rail & Tramcar Co Ltd
- The trade name of the swinging-tray record changer used in Wurlitzer jukeboxes from the 1930s to the 1950s
- A brand of fire alarm systems made by SimplexGrinnell
- A manufacturer of jacks used in railroads and mining industries, now owned by Actuant Corporation

== Linguistics ==
- A monomorphemic form of a word that is not a part of a compound or derivational affixes

== Mathematics ==
- Simplex, a term in geometry meaning an n-dimensional analogue of a triangle
  - Simplicial polytope, a polytope with all simplex facets
  - Simplicial complex, a collection of simplicies
- Pascal's simplex, a version of Pascal's triangle of more than three dimensions
- Simplex algorithm, a popular algorithm for numerical solution of linear programming problems
- Simplex graph, derived from the cliques of another graph
- Simplex noise, a method for constructing an n-dimensional noise function
- Simplex plot, a ternary plot used in game theory

== Technology ==
- Simplex communication, a one-way communications channel
- Simplex signaling, signalling in which two conductors are used for a single channel
- Simplex, using a single frequency for transmit and receive instead of an amateur radio repeater
- SimpleX Chat, a privacy focused messaging application
- Simplex printing, printing one sided pages, a technique that is contrast to duplex printing
- Small Innovative Missions for Planetary Exploration (SIMPLEx) program at NASA
