= Duplex =

Duplex (Latin, 'double') may refer to:

== Arts and entertainment ==
- Duplex (film), or Our House, a 2003 American black comedy film
- Duplex (band), a Dutch electronic music duo
- Duplex (Norwegian duo)
- Duplex!, a Canadian children's music band
- The Duplex, an American comic strip by Glenn McCoy
- The Duplex (film), a 2015 Nigerian film

== Places ==
- Duplex, Tennessee, U.S.
- Duplex, Texas, U.S.

== Science and technology ==
- Duplex (moth), a genus of moths in the family Erebidae
- Nucleic acid double helix, a double-stranded molecule of DNA or RNA
- Duplex (telecommunications), communications in both directions simultaneously
- Duplex (typography), a Linotype technique
- Duplex ultrasonography, a medical imaging technique
- Google Duplex, an extension of Google Assistant

== Transportation ==
- Duplex (automobile), an early car built in Canada in 1923
- Duplex locomotive, a type of steam locomotive
- TGV Duplex, a French high-speed train of the TGV family featuring bi-level carriages
- Duplex A86, a 10 km (6.2 mi) tunnel in Paris

== Other uses ==
- Duplex (building), two living units attached to each other
- Duplex apartment
- Duplex printing, double-sided printing
- Duplex stainless steel, a family of high-strength stainless steels
- Edward Duplex, a 19th-century African-American pioneer
