= Distributive numeral =

Word that answers "how many times each?"

Distributive numbers versus multipliers
Distributive numbers	singly	doubly	triply
Multipliers	single	double	triple

In linguistics, a distributive numeral, or distributive number word, is a word that answers "how many times each?" or "how many at a time?", such as singly or doubly. They are contrasted with multipliers. In English, this part of speech is rarely used and much less recognized than cardinal numbers and ordinal numbers, but it is clearly distinguished and commonly used in Latin and several Romance languages, such as Romanian.

== English ==
In English distinct distributive numerals exist, such as singly, doubly, and triply, and are derived from the corresponding multiplier (of Latin origin, via French) by suffixing -y (reduction of Middle English -lely > -ly). However, this is more commonly expressed periphrastically, such as "one by one", "two by two"; "one at a time", "two at a time"; "one of each", "two of each"; "in twos", "in threes"; or using a counter word as in "in groups of two" or "two pieces to a ...". Examples include:

- Please get off the bus one by one so no one falls.
- She jumped up the steps two at a time.
- Students worked in the lab in twos and threes.
- Students worked in groups of two and three. and
- Students worked two people to a team.

The suffixes -some (as in twosome, threesome) and -fold (as in two-fold, three-fold) are also used, though also relatively infrequently. For musical groups solo, duo, trio, quartet, etc. are commonly used, and pair is used for a group of two.

A conspicuous use of distributive numbers is in arity or adicity, to indicate how many parameters a function takes. Most commonly this uses Latin distributive numbers and -ary, as in unary, binary, ternary, but sometimes Greek numbers are used instead, with -adic, as in monadic, dyadic, triadic.

== Other languages ==
Georgian, Latin, and Romanian are notable languages with distributive numerals; see Romanian distributive numbers. An example of this difference can be seen in Latin with the distributive number for 'one hundred'. While the cardinal number is 'centum', the distributive form is "centēnī,-ae, a".

In Japanese numerals, distributive forms are formed regularly from a cardinal number, a counter word, and the suffix -zutsu (ずつ), as in hitori-zutsu (一人ずつ; one person at a time, one person each).

In Bisayan languages, notably Cebuano, Hiligaynon, and Waray, distributive numbers are formed by adding the prefix tag- on the cardinal number, as in tagpito (seven of each) and tag-upat (four of each). In Cebuano, some distributive forms undergo metathesis or syncope, such as tagsa (from tag-usa), tagurha (from tagduha), tagutlo (from tagtulo), and tagilma (from taglima).

In Turkish, one of the -ar/-er suffixes (chosen according to vowel harmony) is added to the end of a cardinal numeral, as in "birer" (one of each) and "dokuzar" (nine of each). If the numeral ends with a vowel, a letter ş comes to the middle; as in "ikişer" (two of each) and "altışar" (six of each).

== See also ==
- Cardinal number
- Ordinal number
