= Duplex (band) =

Dutch electronica band

Duplex is an electronic music duo based out of Rotterdam. It consists of John Matze and Chris Callahan. After several 12 inch singles, remixes and EPs released on labels such as Clone Records, Dub Recordings and Groundzero, Duplex issued their debut album Late Night Driving in 2006 on Clone. Their sound combines elements of techno and deep house. Much of their back catalog was recently made available to purchase online via Warp Records' Bleep.com music store.

== Discography ==
=== EPs ===
- EP 1 (10") Djak-Up-Bitch (DUB) 1997
- EP 2 (12") Djak-Up-Bitch (DUB) 1997
- EP 3 (12") Clone 2000
- EP 4 (12") Clone 2000
- Autosave (12") Ground Zero 2001
- EP 5 (12") Clone 2001
- Autoload EP (12") Clone 2002
- Rebuild (12") Clone 2002
- Rebuild Part 2 (12") Clone 2002
- Overdue EP (12") Klakson 2003
- Fictional Frequency (12") Frantic Flowers 2005
- P.O.M. Remixed (12") Clone 2005
- Autosug EP (12") Clone 2006
- Autosample EP (12") Frantic Flowers 2007

=== Albums ===
- 2005 Late Night Driving
- Late Night Driving (2xLP) Clone 2006
- Late Night Driving (CD) Clone 2006

=== Remixes ===
- My Dance (Duplex Reshaper) Tsunami 2001
- Mauler (12") PGM 400 (Duplex Mix) Keynote 2002
- Punk (CD, Maxi) Punk (Duplex Remix) Zeitgeist 2002
- Ultraism EP (12", EP) Musical Intrigue (Dupl... Digital Soul 2002
- Love Bubble (12") In For Deep (Duplex Re... Fortek 2004
- Oblivion (Duplex Remix) AW-Recordings 2006
- Gyal Flex / Left Then Up (12") Left Then Up (Duplex Mix) Seventh Sign Recordings 2007
