= Aviion =

Aviion logo

Aviion (styled AViiON) was a series of computers from Data General that were the company's main product from the late 1980s until the company's server products were discontinued in 2001. Earlier Aviion models used the Motorola 88000 CPU, but later models moved to an all-Intel solution when Motorola stopped work on the 88000 in the early 1990s. Some versions of these later Intel-based machines ran Windows NT, while higher-end machines ran the company's flavor of Unix, DG/UX.

== History ==
Data General (DG) had, for most of its history, essentially mirrored the strategy of DEC with a competitive (but, in the spirit of the time, incompatible) minicomputer with a better price/performance ratio. However, by the 1980s, Data General was clearly in a downward spiral relative to DEC. With the performance of custom-designed minicomputer CPU's dropping relative to commodity microprocessors, the cost of developing a custom solution no longer paid for itself. A better solution was to use these same commodity processors, but put them together in such a way to offer better performance than a commodity machine could offer.

By 1989 Unix RISC workstations from Sun Microsystems and others increasingly lured customers from DG and DEC. With Aviion, introduced that year, DG shifted its sight from a purely proprietary minicomputer line to the burgeoning Unix server market. The new line was based around the Motorola 88000, a high performance RISC processor with some support for multiprocessing and a particularly clean architecture. The machines ran a System V Unix variant known as DG/UX, largely developed at the company's Research Triangle Park facility. DG/UX had previously run on the company's family of Eclipse MV 32-bit minicomputers (the successors to Nova and the 16-bit Eclipse minis) but only in a very secondary role to the Eclipse MV mainstay AOS/VS and AOS/VS II operating systems. Also, some Aviion servers from this era ran the proprietary Meditech MAGIC operating system.

From February 1988 to October 1990, Robert E. Cousins was the Department Manager for workstation development. During this time they produced the Maverick project and several follow-ons including the 300, 310 and 400 series workstations along with the 4000 series servers.

Aviion were released in a variety of sizes beginning in the summer of 1989. They debuted as a pizza box workstation (codenamed "Maverick") and a server in both roller-mounted and rackmount flavors ("Topgun"). Speed-bumped and scaled-up versions followed, culminating in, first, the 16-CPU AV/9500 server and then the up to 32-way AV 10000 server in 1995, DG's first implementation of a Non-Uniform Memory Access (NUMA) design. Workstations remained part of the line for a time, but the emphasis increasingly shifted towards servers.

In 1992, Motorola joined the AIM alliance to develop "cut down" versions of the IBM POWER CPU design into a single-chip CPU for desktop machines, and eventually stopped further development of the 88000. Because of this, DG gave up working with Motorola, and decided instead to align its efforts with what was soon to become the clear winner in volume microprocessors, and used i386 architecture CPUs from Intel instead.

This resulted in a second series of Aviion machines based first on the Pentium, and later on faster Pentium Pro, Pentium II and Pentium III Xeon CPUs. This more commoditized hardware approach also led DG to develop NUMA servers that added a memory-coherent interconnect (Scalable Coherent Interconnect (SCI)) to "standard high-volume" x86 motherboards sourced from Intel. Sequent Computer Systems, now part of IBM, was following a similar strategy at the time. A system codenamed "Manx" was an earlier NUMA effort based on the original Pentium and Zenith hardware, but it was never brought to market. The AV 20000 ("Audubon") connected to 32 Pentium Pro processors (on up to eight quad-processor building blocks) in this manner; the later AV 25000 ("Audubon 2") upgrade expanded this to 64 Pentium II (later Pentium III) Xeons.

Based on the burgeoning popularity of Windows NT, Intel-based Aviion servers also added Windows to their OS roster across the Aviion x86 line. It ended up contributing a significant percentage of revenues at the low-end, especially among existing DG customers who had made a decision to switch to NT. However, at the high-end, although Windows NT could run efficiently on single-block (i.e. quad-processor) building blocks in NUMA servers, it did not at the time have the processor and memory affinity optimizations that are required to achieve high performance on larger systems. As a result, Windows on DG NUMA servers was always more of a marketing story than a technical reality.

Around the same time, DG was also aggressively working towards an "industry standard" Unix operating system with the Santa Cruz Operation and others. However, first with SCO's Data Center Acceleration Program (DCAP), and then Project Monterey, this never came to pass. Ultimately, DG's NUMA servers ended up as just another large-scale proprietary Unix server at a time when the industry was coalescing around the Unix platform variants of just a few large vendors — Compaq (later acquired by HP), HP, IBM, and Sun Microsystems.

In 1999, EMC purchased Data General for 1.2 billion dollars primarily to gain access to its CLARiiON line of disk array storage products and associated software. Under the terms of the "pooling of interests merger," EMC maintained the server line for two years, but discontinued it as soon as the terms of the deal allowed, at which point Aviion disappeared.

== Notes ==
The name "AViiON" has often been claimed to be an anagram of "Nova II", the Nova being one of DG's most successful products. An employee competition was held to choose a name for the new line, but none of the suggestions was found to be acceptable for trademarking purposes. Given that early codenames for Eclipse systems included The Bird and The Big Bird, a reference to flight seemed appropriate. "Avion" had been suggested, but lacked the ability to be trademarked. At that time, two European companies had created a naming trend using repeated vowels - Baan and BiiN. Avion was modified by repeating the 'i' and making the rest of the word uppercase as AViiON. (Avion (or avión) is the word for "aircraft" in French and Spanish.)

The use of the "ii" was carried through to the CLARiiON and THiiN Line product lines.
