= CEO (Data General) =

Comprehensive Electronic Office (CEO)
- Developer: Data General
- Initial release: 1981; 44 years ago
- Operating system: AOS and AOS/VS
- Type: Office suite

Comprehensive Electronic Office (CEO) was a suite of office automation software from Data General introduced in 1981. It included word processing, email, spreadsheets, business graphics and desktop accessories. The software was developed mostly in PL/I on and for the AOS and AOS/VS operating systems.

== Overview ==
CEO was considered office automation software, which was an attempt to create a paperless office. CEO has also been cited as an example of an executive information system and as a decision support system.

It included a main program known as the Control Program, which offered a menu driven interface on the assorted dumb terminals which existed at the time. The Control Program communicated with separate "Services" like the Mail Server, Calendar Server, File Server (for documents). There was also a Word Processor and a data management program which was also accessible from the Control Program. In 1985, Data General announced a complementary product, TEO (Technical Electronic Office), focused on the office automation needs of engineering professionals.

In later years, CEO offerings grew to include various products to connect to CEO from early personal computers. The first such product was called CEO Connection. Later a product named CEO Object Office shipped which repackaged HP NewWave (an object oriented graphical interface).

CEO code was heavily dependent on the INFOS II database. When Data General moved from the Eclipse MV platform to the AViiON, CEO was not ported to the new platform as the cost would have been prohibitive.

CEO was often compared with IBM's offering, commonly called PROFS.

CEO offered integration with DISOSS and SNADS. CEO also supported Xodiac, Data General's proprietary networking system. In 1989, Data General unveiled an email gateway product, Communications Server, which provided interoperability of CEO with X.400 email systems and X.500 directories.

One early CEO site, Deutsche Credit in Chicago, first installed CEO while it was under beta in 1980, and by 1986 had 80 users of the product.

Other users included the U.S. Forest Service, who installed CEO in 1983, and whose CEO system fell victim to a hacking attack in December 1984. CEO was also formerly used by Health and Welfare Canada as its departmental email system.
