= DF-224 =

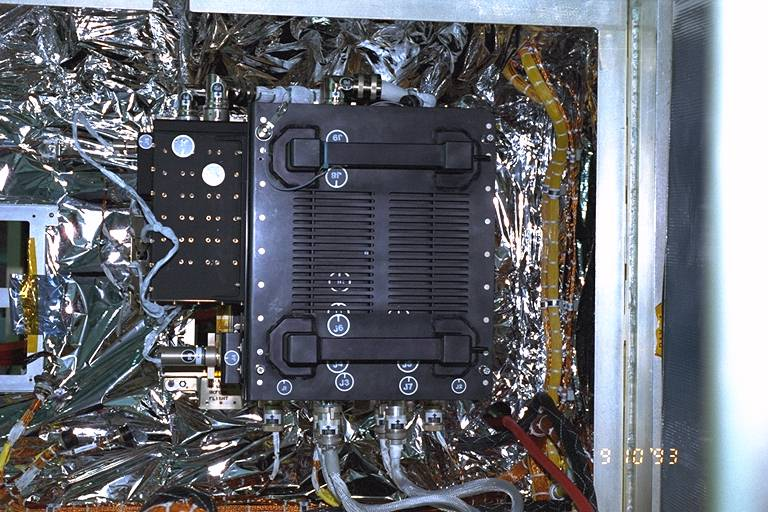
DF-224 in the Hubble Space Telescope

The DF-224 is a space-qualified computer used in space missions from the 1980s. It was built by Rockwell Autonetics. As with many spacecraft computers, the design is very redundant, since servicing in space is at best difficult and often impossible. The configuration had three CPUs, one active and two spares. The main memory consisted of six memory units, each with 8K 24-bit words of plated-wire memory, with up to 48K words total. Four memory modules could be powered up at one time, resulting in a maximum of 32K words of available memory, though some applications such as the Hubble Space Telescope used fewer memory banks to allow for graceful failure modes. There were three I/O processors, one operational and two backups. The power supply consisted of 6 independent power converters, with overlapping coverage of the operating functions. The processor used fixed-point arithmetic with a two's complement format.

Compared to computers that came later, the DF-224 was big and slow. It was roughly 45 centimeters (18 in) by 45 centimeters (18 in) by 30 centimeters (12 in), weighed 50 kilograms (110 lb), and had a clock speed of 1.25 MHz.

The DF-224 on HST was augmented with a 386 co-processor on the first servicing mission (SM1). This had a clock speed of 16 MHz.

In Hubble servicing mission 3A the DF-224 (with co-processor) was replaced by the Advanced Computer using a 25 MHz Intel i486, and much more storage

The DF-224 was one of the candidate computers for the Space Shuttle, but was not selected. It was also baselined in a version of a reusable Agena upper stage for use with the Shuttle, but this was never built.

== See also ==
- IBM RAD6000 – a more modern space-qualified computer
- RAD750 – a newer version of the RAD6000
- Mongoose-V – radiation-hard processor based on the MIPS-3000
- Various implementations of the MIL-STD-1750A 16-bit processor have been used in several spacecraft
