= SuperDOS =

SuperDOS or Super DOS may refer to:

- Bluebird SuperDOS, used on some Data General computers
- Technical Support SuperDOS, used on some Atari computers
- Concurrent DOS 286, Digital Research's modular multi-user multitasking operating system since 1985
- FlexOS 286, the Digital Research Concurrent DOS 286 successor since 1986

== See also ==
- Novell SuperNOS, a never released project to merge NetWare and UnixWare
