= Data General AOS =

- Developer: Data General
- Working state: Discontinued
- Source model: Closed-source
- Supported platforms: Data General 16-bit Eclipse C, M, and S minicomputers and 32-bit Eclipse MV line
- Default user interface: Command-line interpreter
- License: Proprietary commercial software

Data General AOS (an abbreviation for Advanced Operating System) was the name of a family of operating systems for Data General 16-bit Eclipse C, M, and S minicomputers, followed by AOS/VS and AOS/RT32 (1980) and later AOS/VS II (1988) for the 32-bit Eclipse MV line.

== Overview ==
AOS/VS exploited the 8-ring protection architecture of the Eclipse MV hardware with ring 7 being the least privileged and ring 0 being the most privileged. The AOS/VS kernel ran in ring 0 and used ring-1 addresses for data structures related to virtual address translations. Ring 2 was unused and reserved for future use by the kernel. The Agent, which performed much of the system call validation for the AOS/VS kernel, as well as some I/O buffering and many compatibility functions, ran in ring 3 of each process. Ring 4 was used by various D.G. products such as the INFOS II DBMS. Rings 5 and 6 were reserved for use by user programs but rarely used except for large software such as the MV/UX inner-ring emulator and Oracle which used ring 5. All user programs ran in ring 7.

The AOS software was far more advanced than competing PDP-11 operating systems. 16-bit AOS applications ran natively under AOS/VS and AOS/VS II on the 32-bit Eclipse MV line. AOS/VS (Advanced Operating System/Virtual Storage) was the most commonly used DG software product, and included a command-line interpreter (CLI) allowing for complex scripting, DUMP/LOAD, and other custom components.

The 16-bit version of the CLI is famous for including an Easter egg meant to honor Xyzzy (which was pronounced "magic"). This was the internal code name of what externally became known as the AOS/VS 32-bit operating system. A user typing in the command "xyzzy" would get back a response from the CLI of "Nothing Happens". When a 32-bit version of the CLI became available under AOS/VS II, the same command instead reported "Twice As Much Happens".

A modified version of System V.2 Unix called MV/UX hosted under AOS/VS was also available. A modified version of System V Unix called DG/UX was made for the Eclipse MV line and later the 88K and x86 AViiON machines.

The AOS and AOS/VS kernels were written entirely in assembly language. Almost all of the AOS and AOS/VS utilities included in the operating system releases were written in DG/L, a variant of the ALGOL/60 programming language. Initially, AOS/VS utilities closely tracked AOS source development. As AOS/VS matured, many DG-supplied utilities were rewritten to take advantage of the 32-bit address space and reduce dependencies on assembly language, often resulting in substantial increases in functionality, performance and reliability compared with their AOS ancestors.

== Session ==
**** Atari S/W Development HCD1 / BATCH OUTPUT FILE ****

AOS/VS  3.07 / EXEC  3.07	19-JAN-84	10:11:01	
QPRI=254	SEQ=31324
INPUT FILE -- :UDD:SYSTEMS:850:?031.CLI.004.JOB (WILL BE DELETED AFTER PROCESSING)
LIST FILE  -- :QUEUE:NORDIN.LIST.31324

--------
LAST MESSAGE CHANGE	12-JAN-84	16:06:08

		Atari S/W Development System HCD1

Backup schedule (system shut down): Saturday  21-Jan-84  9:30-11:30am

Refer to HELP *COMMANDS, HELP *PSEUDO, HELP, APHELP, and ?MHELP.

Refer to DISP FUNC in SED for list of default function key commands.

--------
LAST PREVIOUS LOGON	19-JAN-84	10:09:45
* searchlist :UDD:NORDIN:UTIL :UDD:NORDIN:LINKS :C :UTIL :

AOS/VS CLI   REV 03.03.00.00	19-JAN-84	10:11:05
Ý SEARCHLIST :UDD:SYSTEMS:UTIL,:UDD:NORDIN:UTIL,:UDD:NORDIN:LINKS,:C,:UTIL,:
Ý DIRECTORY :UDD:SYSTEMS:850
Ý DEFACL SYSTEMS,OWARE,A.JOE,OWARE,A.OLIVIA,OWARE,ARKEN,OWARE,BLOTCKY,OWARE,NORDIN,OWARE,TITTSLER,OWARE,FOWKES,OWARE
Ý CAMAC R850AMAC H=R850AMAC.OBJ L=R850AMAC.PRN R=F SL=132 


ATARI CAMAC Assembler Ver  1.0A
Copyright 1981 ATARI Inc.

Enter source file name and options

d:R850AMAC  h=d:R850AMAC.OBJ l=d:R850AMAC.PRN R=F SL=132           

  Pass 1 - Reading D1:R850AMAC.   
  Pass 2 - Reading D1:R850AMAC.   

  no ERRORs,  669 Labels, $67E8 free.
�

ATARI CAMAC Assembler Ver  1.0A
Copyright 1981 ATARI Inc.

Enter source file name and options



Ý 
Ý 
END OF FILE
AOS/VS CLI   TERMINATING	19-JAN-84	10:12:06

PROCESS 42 TERMINATED 
ELAPSED TIME  0:01:06
(OTHER JOBS, SAME USERNAME)
USER 'NORDIN' LOGGED OFF 	19-JAN-84	10:12:07


****
* LIST FILE EMPTY, WILL NOT BE PRINTED
****

== See also ==
- Data General RDOS
- CEO (Data General)
