= Index register =

CPU register used for modifying operand addresses

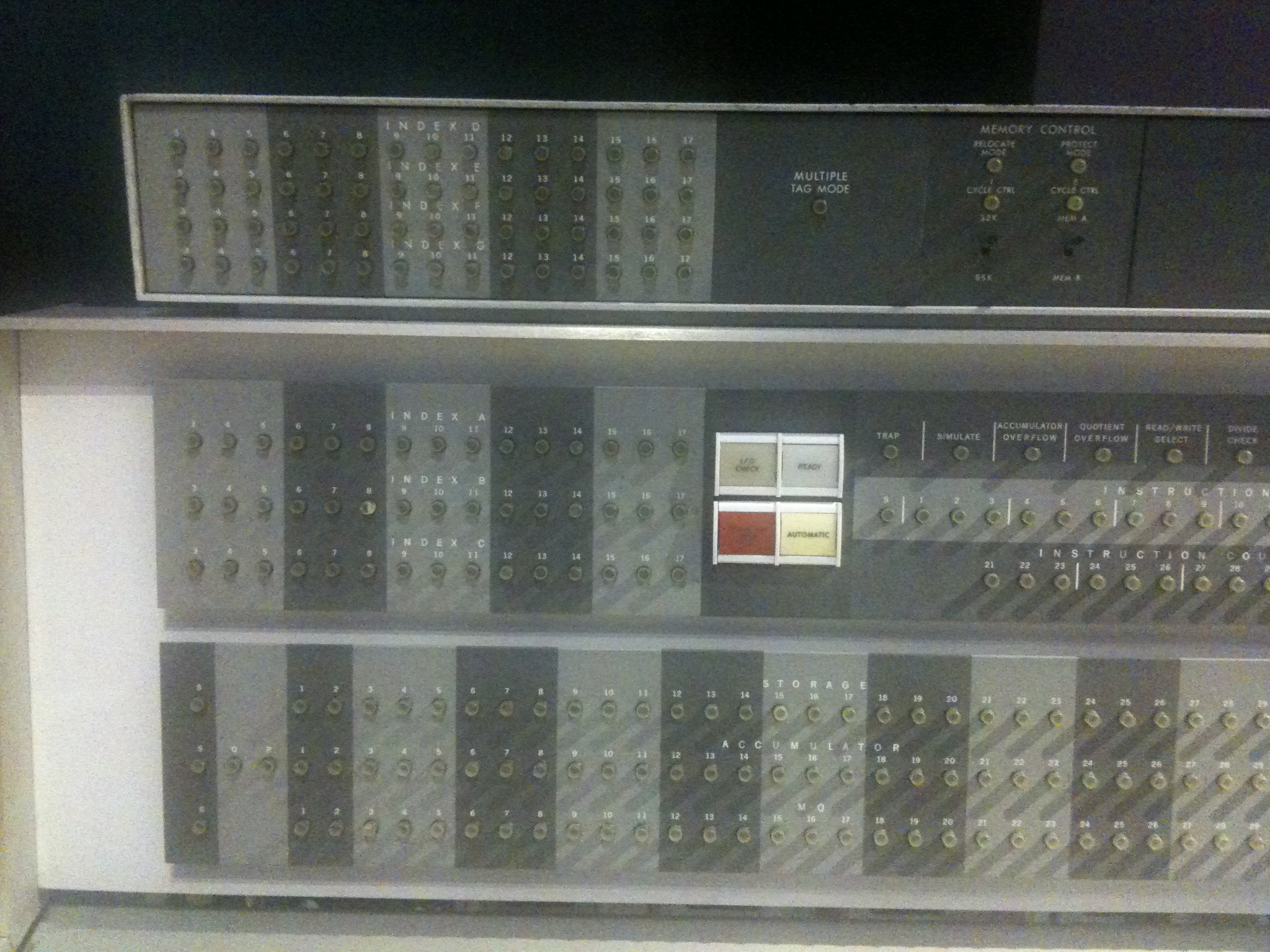
Index register display on an IBM 7094 mainframe from the early 1960s

An index register in a computer's CPU is a processor register (or an assigned memory location) used for pointing to operand addresses during the run of a program. It is useful for stepping through strings and arrays. It can also be used for holding loop iterations and counters. In some architectures it is used for read/writing blocks of memory. Depending on the architecture it may be a dedicated index register or a general-purpose register. Some instruction sets allow more than one index register to be used; in that case additional instruction fields may specify which index registers to use.

Generally, the contents of an index register is added to (in some cases subtracted from) an immediate address (that can be part of the instruction itself or held in another register) to form the "effective" address of the actual data (operand). Special instructions are typically provided to test the index register and, if the test fails, increments the index register by an immediate constant and branches, typically to the start of the loop. While normally processors that allow an instruction to specify multiple index registers add the contents together, IBM had a line of computers in which the contents were or'd together.

Index registers have proved useful for doing vector/array operations and in commercial data processing for navigating from field to field within records. In both uses index registers substantially reduced the amount of memory used and increased execution speed.

== History ==
In early computers without any form of indirect addressing, array operations had to be performed by modifying the instruction address, which required several additional program steps and used up more computer memory, a scarce resource in computer installations of the early era (as well as in early microcomputers two decades later).

Index registers, commonly known as B-lines in early British computers, as B-registers on some machines and as X-registers (Note: The term X-registers was also used for accumulators on, e.g., the CDC 6600.) on others, were first used in the British Manchester Mark 1 computer, in 1949. In general, index registers became a standard part of computers during the technology's second generation, roughly 1954–1966. Most (Note: The 702, 705 and 7080 did not have index registers.) machines in the IBM 700/7000 mainframe series had them, starting with the IBM 704 in 1954, though they were optional on some smaller machines such as the IBM 650 and IBM 1401.

Early "small machines" with index registers include the AN/USQ-17, around 1960, and the 9 series of real-time computers from Scientific Data Systems, from the early 1960s.

The 1962 UNIVAC 1107 has 15 X-registers, four of which were also A-registers.

The 1964 GE-635 has 8 dedicated X-registers; however, it also allows indexing by the instruction counter or by either half of the A or Q register.

The Digital Equipment Corporation (DEC) PDP-6, introduced in 1964, and the IBM System/360, announced in 1964, do not include dedicated index registers; instead, they have general-purpose registers (called "accumulators" in the PDP-6) that can contain either numerical values or addresses. The memory address of an operand is, in the PDP-6, the sum of the contents of a general-purpose register and an 18-bit offset and, on the System/360, the sum of the contents of two general-purpose registers and a 12-bit offset. The compatible PDP-10 line of successors to the PDP-6, and the IBM System/370 and later compatible successors to the System/360, including the current z/Architecture, work in the same fashion.

The 1969 Data General Nova and successor Eclipse, and 1970 DEC PDP-11, minicomputers also provided general-purpose registers (called "accumulators" in the Nova and Eclipse), rather than separate accumulators and index registers, as did their Eclipse MV and VAX 32-bit superminicomputer successors. In the PDP-11 and VAX, any register could be used when calculating the memory address of an operand; in the Nova, Eclipse, and Eclipse MV, only registers 2 and 3 could be used.

The 1971 CDC STAR-100 has a register file of 256 64-bit registers, 9 of which are reserved. Unlike most computers, the STAR-100 instructions only have register fields and operand fields, so the registers serve more as pointer registers than as traditional index registers.

While the 1972 Intel 8008 allowed indirect addressing via register pairs, the first microprocessor with a true index register appears to have been the 1974 Motorola 6800.

In 1975, the 8-bit MOS Technology 6502 processor had two index registers 'X' and 'Y'.

In 1978, the Intel 8086, the first x86 processor, had eight 16-bit registers, referred to as "general-purpose", all of which can be used as integer data registers in most operations; four of them, 'SI' (source index), 'DI' (destination index), 'BX' (base), and 'BP' (base pointer), can also be used when computing the memory address of an operand, which is the sum of one of those registers and a displacement, or the sum of one of 'BX' or 'BP", one of 'SI' or 'DI', and a displacement. The 1979 Intel 8088, and the 16-bit Intel 80186, Intel 80188, and Intel 80286 successors work the same. In 1985, the i386, a 32-bit successor to those processors, introducing the IA-32 32-bit version of the x86 architecture, extended the eight 16-bit registers to 32 bits, with "E" added to the beginning of the register name; in IA-32, the memory address of an operand is the sum of one of those eight registers, one of seven of those registers (the stack pointer is not allowed as the second register here) multiplied by 1, 2, 4, or 8, and a displacement. The Advanced Micro Devices Opteron, the first model of which was released in 2003, introduced x86-64, the 64-bit version of the x86 instruction set; in x86-64, the general-purpose registers were extended to 64 bits, and eight additional general-purpose registers were added; the memory address of an operand is the sum of two of those 16 registers and a displacement.

The reduced instruction set computing (RISC) instruction sets introduced in the 1980s and 1990s all provide general-purpose registers that can contain either numerical values or address values. In most of those instruction sets, there are 32 general-purpose registers (in some of those instruction sets, the value of one of those registers is hardwired to zero) could be used to calculate the operand address; they did not have dedicated index registers. In the 32-bit version of the ARM architecture, first developed in 1985, there are 16 registers designated as "general-purpose registers", but only 13 of them can be used for all purposes, with register R15 containing the program counter. The memory address of a load or store instruction is the sum of any of the 16 registers and either a displacement or another of the registers with the exception of R15 (possibly shifted left for scaling). In the 64-bit version of the ARM architecture, there are 31 64-bit general-purpose registers plus a stack pointer and a zero register; the memory address of a load or store instruction is the sum of any of the 31 registers and either a displacement or another of the registers.

== Examples ==
Here is a simple example of index register use in assembly language pseudo-code that sums a 100 entry array of 4-byte words:

   Clear_accumulator
   Load_index 400,index2  //load 4*array size into index register 2 (index2)
loop_start : Add_word_to_accumulator array_start,index2   //Add to AC the word at the address (array_start + index2)
   Branch_and_decrement_if_index_not_zero loop_start,4,index2   //loop decrementing by 4 until index register is zero

== See also ==
- For loop
