= AOS/VS II =

- Developer: Data General
- OS family: AOS
- Working state: Discontinued
- Initial release: 1988; 38 years ago
- Latest release: VS-II (rev. 3.2x)
- Supported platforms: MV/Eclipse

AOS/VS II is a discontinued operating system for the Data General 32-bit MV/Eclipse computers.

== Overview ==
The AOS/VS II operating system was released in 1988 and was originally to be simply rev 8.00 of the AOS/VS operating system. However, it introduced a new file system which was not compatible with the original AOS and AOS/VS file system and also contained new features like Access control list (ACL) groups. Since some customers did not want to upgrade to the new file system, or invest in new hardware, Data General agreed to continue bug-fix support of an “immortal” revision of AOS/VS, which became known colloquially as AOS/VS “Classic”, while new development would proceed as AOS/VS II, with revision numbers rolled back to 1.00.

Both VS-Classic (rev 7.7x) and VS-II (rev. 3.2x) were updated to survive the Year 2000 problem, although by this time both were obsolescent.

Among the other new features that were part of AOS/VS II were a full TCP/IP stack, NFS support, expanded kernel address space using ring-1 and a logical disk-level user data cache. /VS (classic) had a file system metadata cache, but no user data cache.

== See also ==
- Data General RDOS
