= Data General Business Basic =

Specific programming language developed by Data General

- Family: BASIC
- Developer: Data General
- Platform: Nova
- License: Commercial proprietary software

Influenced by
- MAI Basic Four

Influenced
- Atari BASIC

Data General Business Basic was a BASIC interpreter (based on a version from MAI Basic Four) marketed by Data General for their Nova minicomputer in the 1970s, and later ported to the Data General Eclipse MV and AViiON computers. Most business applications for the Nova were developed in Business Basic.

== Description ==
Business Basic was an integer-only language inspired by COBOL, and contained powerful string-handling functions and the ability to manipulate indexed files very quickly. It also provided full control over the display screen, with cursor positioning, attribute setting, and region-blanking commands. Business Basic could interface to Data General's INFOS II database, and make calls directly to the operating system. A lock server gave multiple concurrent users efficient access to database records.

Small business programs could be developed and debugged rapidly with Business Basic because of the interactive nature of the interpreter, but the language did not provide many structured programming features, and as programs grew larger, maintenance became a problem. There was limited memory space for Business Basic programs on the Nova, and programmers often resorted to tricks such as self-modifying programs, which was easy to program in Business Basic, but complicated to debug.

The original version of the language was "double precision", i.e. 32-bit (and so each integer used two 16-bit Nova words). When Data General ported the language to the MV line, they included two copies of the language, one "double precision", and one "triple precision". The two were incompatible with each other in subtle ways. Although Data General improved the language in some ways, such as adding multiple-line IF THEN ELSE END IF statements, they failed to lift many of the constraints of the language on the MV machines, such as a 9,999 line maximum, 384 variable limit, and maximum of 16 open files.

== Competing BASICs ==
An early competitor to Data General's Business Basic was Bluebird Business Basic, a compiled language running on its proprietary SuperDOS (Bluebird) platform. Bluebird's Basic was not fully compatible with Data General's.

B32 Business Basic was a highly compatible interpreter which ran on the Eclipse MV line. It lifted many of the Data General Business Basic constraints, and ran significantly faster by using the full power of the 32-bit processor. B32 stored all variables internally as 64-bit, and emulated double and triple precision as required. It also provided new language features. B32 was ported to Unix and later to DOS, allowing Data General's customers to readily move to other hardware vendors. B32 also had substantial compatibility with Bluebird Business Basic.

Transoft produced another competitor to Data General's Business Basic, Universal Business Basic. UBB ran on Unix and DOS, and was substantially compatible with Data General's Business Basic. Transoft purchased B32 in 1992.

Data General ported Business Basic to the AViiON, but B32 and UBB were already available on that platform. Data General's programmers did have one major success on the AViiON when they unveiled a new version of Business Basic at a "shootout" between themselves, B32 and UBB. Data General had added a caching mechanism to speed up their Business Basic's disk access, and it outperformed the other companies' products. Within a month, B32 and UBB had added their own caching mechanisms, and drawn ahead of Data General again.

Transoft's UBB is now sold as the Universal Business Language.

== See also ==
- Multiuser DOS Federation
