= DG/UX =

- Developer: Data General
- Written in: C
- OS family: UNIX System V with additions from BSD
- Working state: Historic
- Initial release: March 1985; 40 years ago
- Latest release: 5.4 Release 4.20 (MU07) / April 2001; 24 years ago
- Available in: English
- Supported platforms: Eclipse MV minicomputer line, AViiON workstation and server line
- Default user interface: IXI X.desktop environment

DG/UX is a discontinued Unix operating system developed by Data General for its Eclipse MV minicomputer line, and later the AViiON workstation and server line (both Motorola 88000 and Intel IA-32-based variants).

== Overview ==
By 1985 most computer companies offered Unix as an alternative to their proprietary operating systems. DG/UX 1.00, released by Data General in March 1985, was based on UNIX System V Release 2 with additions from 4.1BSD. By 1987, DG/UX 3.10 had been released, with 4.2BSD TCP/IP networking, NFS and the X Window System included. DG/UX 4.00, in 1988, was a comprehensive re-design of the system, based on System V Release 3, and supporting symmetric multiprocessing on the Eclipse MV. The 4.00 filesystem was based on the AOS/VS II filesystem and, using the logical disk facility, could span multiple disks. DG/UX 5.4, released around 1991, replaced the legacy Unix file buffer cache with unified, demand paged virtual memory management. Later versions were based on System V Release 4.

On the AViiON, DG/UX supported multiprocessor machines at a time when most variants of Unix did not. The operating system was also more complete than some other Unix variants; for example, the operating system included a full C compiler (gcc) and also a logical volume manager. The OS was small and compact, but rich in features. It was simple and easy to install and did not require vast resources of memory or processing power. For example, a six-way Pentium Pro-based AViiON would support several hundred users using text terminals.

The volume manager built into the OS was simple, but very powerful. All disk administration could be performed online, without taking any file system offline. This included extending, relocating, mirroring or shrinking. The same functions could be performed on the swap area, allowing in-place migrations of disk storage without downtime. DG/UX 5.4 supported filesystem shrinking, "split mirror" online backup, filesystems up to 2 TB, and filesystem journaling in 1991. Few vendors offered similar features at that time.

DG/UX had a high-performance and stable clustered filesystem. The Clariion storage NAS was connected by high-voltage SCSI controllers, and SCSI hubs. Each server had double SCSI controllers for failover reasons. Both controllers were master on the same bus, at the same time these filesystems were NFS-mounted from the cluster-master's floating IP address. The data was written from each cluster node directly by the SCSI bus, but the orchestration, the inode tables, where written by the NFS-mount from each cluster member.

Later versions added support for processor and memory affinity to support their high-end multiprocessor NUMA AViiON system.
