= Data General RDOS =

Operating system for DG Nova

RDOS
- Developer: Data General
- OS family: Data General
- Working state: Discontinued
- Source model: Closed source
- Initial release: 1970; 56 years ago
- Latest release: RDOS 7.5 / 1986; 40 years ago
- Supported platforms: NOVA, microNOVA, Eclipse
- Kernel type: Monolithic
- Default user interface: Command-line interface
- License: restricted, per machine

The Data General RDOS (Real-time Disk Operating System) is a real-time operating system released in 1970. The software was bundled with the company's popular Nova and Eclipse minicomputers.

== Overview ==
RDOS is capable of multitasking, with the ability to run up to 32 tasks (similar to the current term threads) simultaneously on each of two grounds (foreground and background) within a 64 KB memory space. Later versions of RDOS are compatible with Data General's 16-bit Eclipse minicomputer line.

A cut-down version of RDOS, without real-time background and foreground capability but still capable of running multiple threads and multi-user Data General Business Basic, is called Data General Diskette Operating System (DG-DOS or now—somewhat confusingly—simply DOS); another related operating system is RTOS, a Real-Time Operating System for diskless environments. RDOS on microNOVA-based "Micro Products" micro-minicomputers is sometimes called DG/RDOS.

RDOS was superseded in the early 1980s by Data General's AOS family of operating systems, including AOS/VS and MP/AOS (MP/OS on smaller systems).

=== Commands ===
The following list of commands are supported by the RDOS/DOS CLI.

- ALGOL
- APPEND
- ASM
- BASIC
- BATCH
- BOOT
- BPUNCH
- BUILD
- CCONT
- CDIR
- CHAIN
- CHATR
- CHLAT
- CLEAR
- CLG
- COPY
- CPART
- CRAND
- CREATE
- DEB
- DELETE
- DIR
- DISK
- DUMP
- EDIT
- ENDLOG
- ENPAT
- EQUIV
- EXFG
- FDUMP
- FGND
- FILCOM
- FLOAD
- FORT
- FORTRAN
- FPRINT
- GDIR
- GMEM
- GSYS
- GTOD
- INIT
- LDIR
- LFE
- LINK
- LIST
- LOAD
- LOG
- MAC
- MCABOOT
- MDIR
- MEDIT
- MESSAGE
- MKABS
- MKSAVE
- MOVE
- NSPEED
- OEDIT
- OVLDR
- PATCH
- POP
- PRINT
- PUNCH
- RDOSSORT
- RELEASE
- RENAME
- REPLACE
- REV
- RLDR
- SAVE
- SDAY
- SEDIT
- SMEM
- SPDIS
- SPEBL
- SPEED
- SPKILL
- STOD
- SYSGEN
- TPRINT
- TUOFF
- TUON
- TYPE
- VFU
- XFER

== Antitrust lawsuit ==
In the late 1970s, Data General was sued (under the Sherman and Clayton antitrust acts) by competitors for their practice of bundling RDOS with the Data General Nova or Eclipse minicomputer. When Data General introduced the Data General Nova, a company called Digidyne wanted to use its RDOS operating system on its own hardware clone. Data General refused to license their software and claimed their "bundling rights". In 1985, courts including the United States Court of Appeals for the Ninth Circuit ruled against Data General in a case called Digidyne v. Data General. The Supreme Court of the United States declined to hear Data General's appeal, although Justices White and Blackmun would have heard it. The precedent set by the lower courts eventually forced Data General to license the operating system because restricting the software to only Data General's hardware was an illegal tying arrangement.

In 1999, Data General was taken over by EMC Corporation.
