= Data General Eclipse =

16 bit minicomputer line (1974–1988)

Eclipse

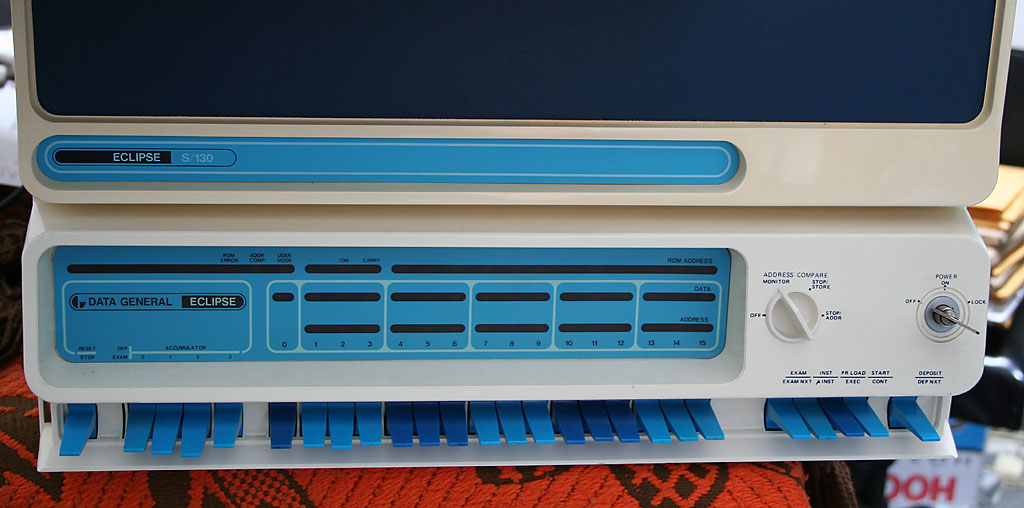
- Data General Eclipse S/130 front panel
- Manufacturer: Data General
- Product family: Nova
- Operating system: AOS

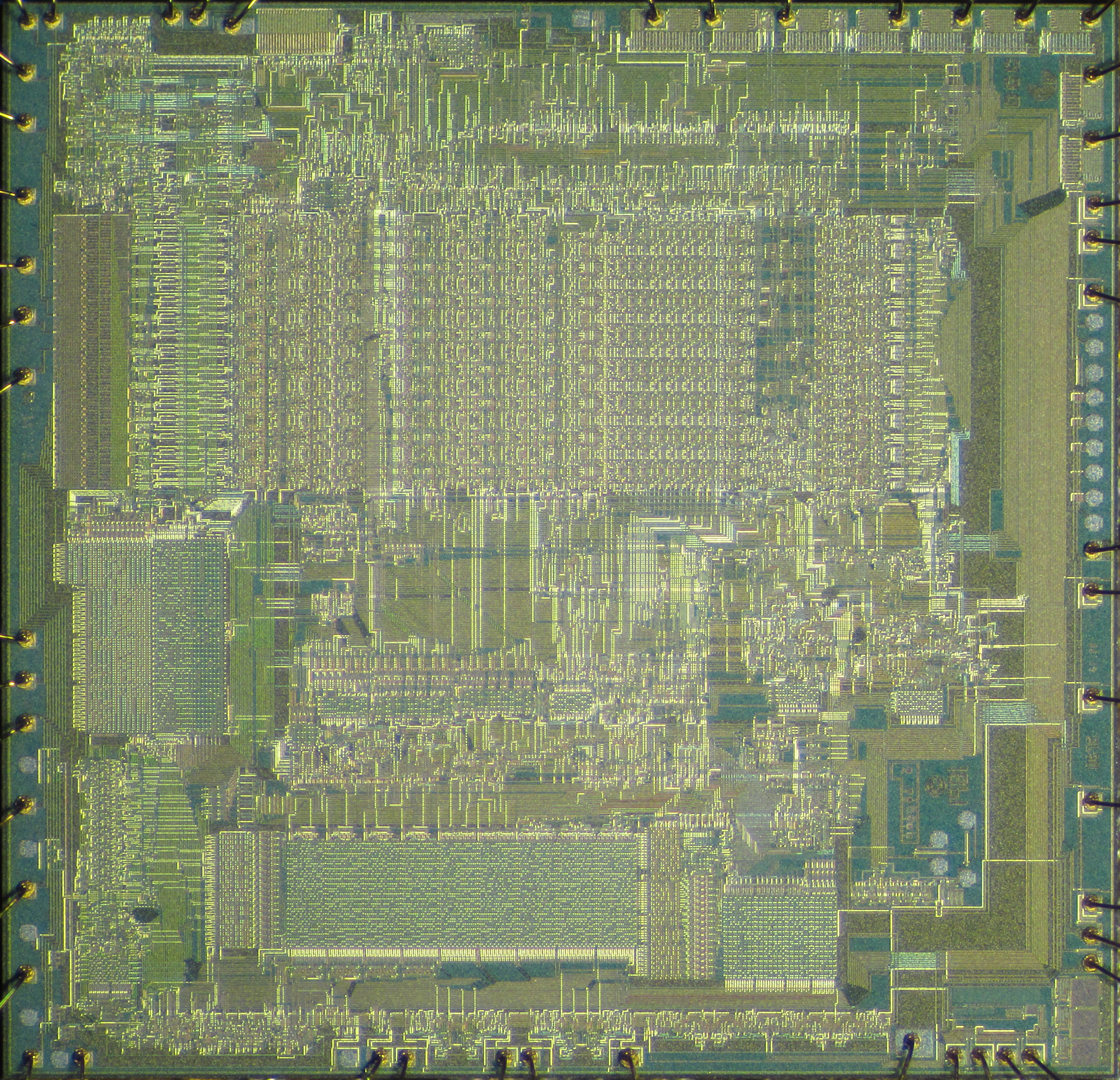
Data General microEclipse microprocessor

The Eclipse by Data General is a line of 16-bit minicomputers released in early 1974 and sold until 1988. The Eclipse was based on many of the same concepts as the Data General Nova, but included support for virtual memory and multitasking more suitable to the small office than the lab. It was also packaged differently for this reason, in a floor-standing case the size of a small refrigerator. The Eclipse series was supplanted by the 32-bit Data General Eclipse MV/8000 in 1980.

== Description ==
The Data General Nova was intended to outperform the PDP-8 while being less expensive, and in a similar fashion, the Eclipse was meant to compete against the larger PDP-11 computers. The Nova had a simple architecture with four 16-bit accumulator registers, the latter two also serving as index registers. The Eclipse kept this layout, and was compatible with Nova code using them, but added four 64-bit registers for floating-point arithmetic support (if installed). Like the Nova, the Eclipse did not directly support byte addressing; the smallest unit of addressable and writable memory is the 16-bit word. A major improvement was the addition of a processor-managed stack pointer, which the Nova lacked. The stack pointer was added into the later Nova 3 machines in 1975, and also used on the later 32-bit Data General Eclipse MV/8000.

The largest change to the programming model was the Memory Allocation and Protection (MAP) system. This broke down main memory into a series of 2,048 byte blocks, and any one program could used up 32 of them, for a total of 64 kb. The maximum memory as a whole expanded from 64 to 256 kb, but MAP made this change invisible to the programs. To existing Nova software, nothing changed, but for software written explicitly for the Eclipse, programs could share blocks of memory with other programs. This was a common architecture at the time for supporting timesharing, which was a primary goal of the Eclipse design.

=== Initial models ===
There were initially two series, S and C, and three individual models of the Eclipse, 100, 200 and 300. The S/100 was the basic model, lacking MAP and the floating point option, both of which were present on the S/200. The C/300 added a collection of additional instructions to the S/200, intended to help implement common routines seen in business applications like converting strings between different character sets, or reading and writing numbers to and from different formats including strings. This Commercial Instruction Set also included fixed-point arithmetic instructions, which were commonly used in currency calculations as they did not lose accuracy. (Note: The PDP-11 included an almost identical Commercial Instruction Set (CIS) as an optional add-on.) To implement these, the C/300 used a modified processor known as the Extended Arithmetic Processor. Another difference between the S and C series was that the former included a writable control store, which allowed the user to write their own instructions and store them in the processor for fast execution.

Production problems with the Eclipse led to a rash of lawsuits in the late 1970s, after new versions of the machine were pre-ordered by many DG customers and then never arrived. After over a year of waiting, some decided to sue the company, while others simply cancelled their orders and went elsewhere. It appeared that the Eclipse was originally intended to replace the Nova outright, also evidenced by the fact that the Nova 3 series released at the same time was phased out the next year. However, strong continuing demand resulted in the Nova 4, perhaps as a result of the continuing problems with the Eclipse.

=== Later models ===
As was the case with the earlier Nova series, the Eclipse underwent continual updating, following changes in semiconductor manufacturing. Unlike the Nova, these generally kept the name of the corresponding original model, adding a model number such that, for instance, the S/100 was replaced by the S/130 and 140.

The main differences in later models was the expansion of the memory model to allow for ever-increasing amounts of main memory. The S/140 supported up to 1 MB. Other changes included the addition of integer multiplication and division in the base unit, as well as a version of the CIS becoming standard on all models.

== Operating systems ==
The AOS operating system was quite sophisticated, advanced compared to the PDP-11 offerings, with access control lists (ACLs) for file protection.

== Facts ==
The original Cray-1 system used an Eclipse to act as a Maintenance and Control Unit (MCU). It was configured with two Ampex CRTs, an 80 MB Ampex disk drive, a thermal printer, and a 9-track tape drive. Its primary purpose was to download an image of either the Cray Operating System or customer engineering diagnostics at boot time. Once booted, it acted as a status and control console via RDOS station software.
