= Data General Eclipse MV/8000 =

1980s family of 32-bit minicomputers

ECLIPSE MV/8000
- Codename: Eagle
- Manufacturer: Data General
- Product family: NOVA/ECLIPSE
- Operating system: AOS/VS
- Predecessor: ECLIPSE

The Eclipse MV/8000 was the first in a family of 32-bit minicomputers produced by Data General during the 1980s. Codenamed Eagle during development, its architecture was a new 32-bit design backward compatible with the previous 16-bit Eclipse series. The development of the computer and the people who worked on it were the subject of Tracy Kidder's book The Soul of a New Machine. The MV/8000 was succeeded by the MV/6000, MV/8000-II, MV/2000, MV/2500, MV/4000, MV/10000, MV15000, MV/20000, MV/30000 and MV/40000. Later models such as the MV/40000 were SMP systems with hot-swappable components.

The Eclipse MV was a 32-bit CISC architecture with a 4 gigabytes logical address space, having a physical address space from 0 to 2 megabytes. The 4 GB address space was divided into eight rings of 512 MB each with a privilege mechanism mapped onto the rings. The outermost ring, ring-7, was the least privileged. The inner-most ring, ring-0, was the most privileged.

The AOS/VS operating system supported the notion of lightweight "tasks" as well as processes. A single process could start various tasks that would all share a global address space (similar to modern "threads"). Tasks were very easy to use from Data General's FORTRAN compiler, and allowed faster context switching than using full processes. One could also start subtasks, using so-called "Son" batch process. This was done using the CLI (Command Line Interpreter). It resulted in a de facto online batch process. This process would, however be killed as soon as the user would log off. The MV/8000 had only two "true" batch processes, as not to frustrate the online processes. The "plus" of the online batches was that they ran with the same priority as the normal online processes.

== See also ==
- DG/UX
