= Data General =

Minicomputer manufacturer, 1968–1999

Data General Corporation

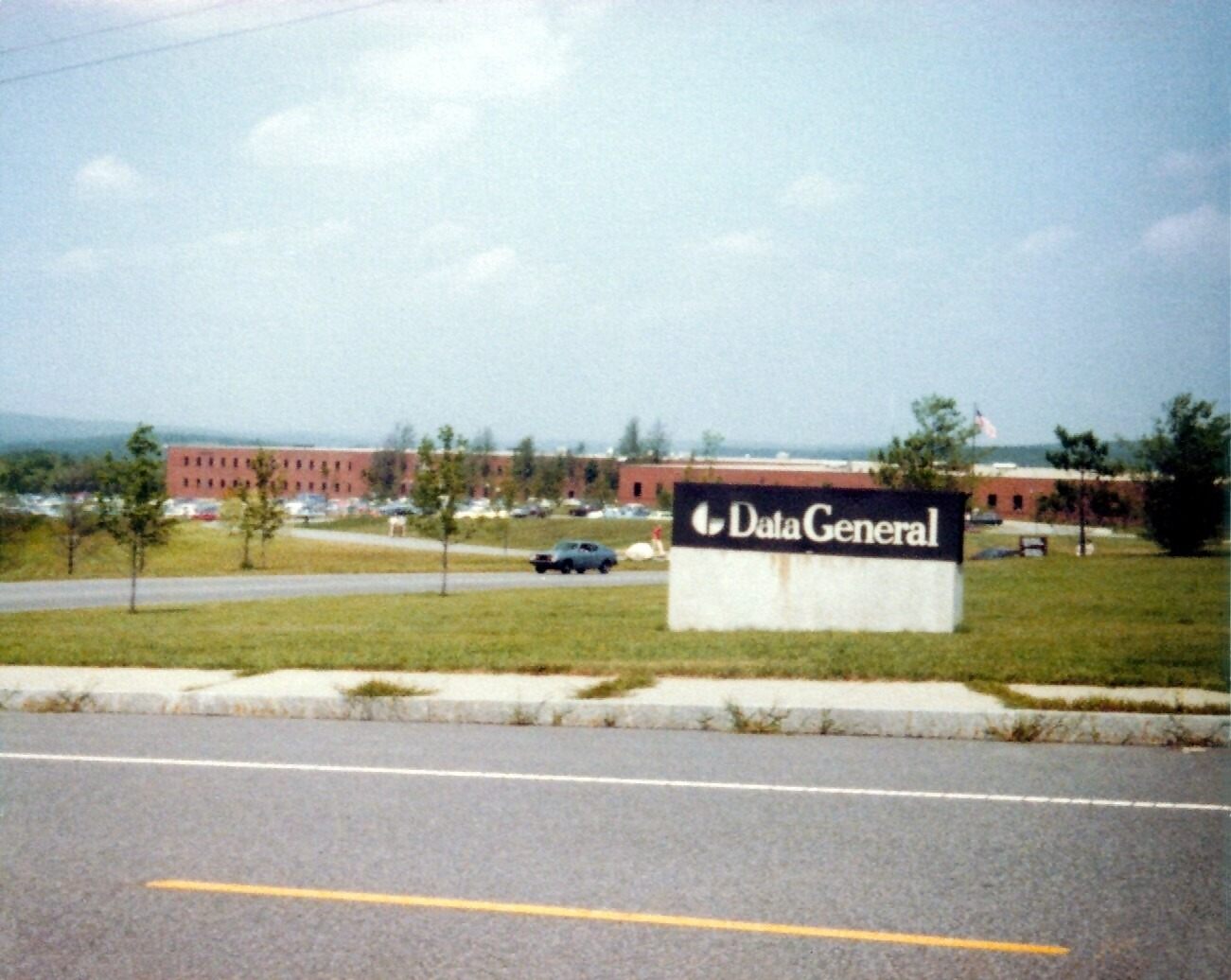
- Headquarters in Westborough, Massachusetts, 1981
- Industry: Computer
- Founded: 1968; 58 years ago
- Defunct: 1999
- Fate: Acquired
- Successor: EMC Corporation
- Headquarters: Westborough, Massachusetts
- Products: Minicomputers, disk arrays

Data General Corporation was an early minicomputer firm formed in 1968. Three of the four founders were former employees of Digital Equipment Corporation (DEC).

Their first product, 1969's Data General Nova, was a 16-bit minicomputer intended to both outperform and cost less than the equivalent from DEC, the 12-bit PDP-8. A basic Nova system cost two-thirds or less than a similar PDP-8 while running faster, offering easy expandability, being significantly smaller, and proving more reliable in the field. Combined with Data General RDOS (DG/RDOS) and programming languages like Data General Business Basic, Novas provided a multi-user platform far ahead of many contemporary systems. A series of updated Nova machines were released through the early 1970s that kept the Nova line at the front of the 16-bit mini world.

The Nova was followed by the Eclipse series which offered much larger memory capacity while still being able to run Nova code without modification. The Eclipse launch was marred by production problems and it was some time before it was a reliable replacement for the tens of thousands of Novas in the market. As the mini world moved from 16-bit to 32, DG introduced the Data General Eclipse MV/8000, whose development was extensively documented in the popular 1981 book, The Soul of a New Machine. Although DG's computers were successful, the introduction of the IBM PC in 1981 marked the beginning of the end for minicomputers, and by the end of the decade, the entire market had largely disappeared. The introduction of the Data General/One in 1984 did nothing to stop the erosion.

In a major business pivot, in 1989 DG released the AViiON series of scalable Unix systems which spanned from desktop workstations to departmental servers. This scalability was managed through the use of NUMA, allowing a number of commodity processors to work together in a single system. Following AViiON was the CLARiiON series of network-attached storage systems which became a major product line in the later 1990s. This led to a purchase by EMC, the major vendor in the storage space at that time. EMC shut down all of DG's lines except for CLARiiON, which continued sales until 2012.

== History ==
=== Origin, founding and early years: Nova and SuperNova ===
Data General (DG) was founded by several engineers from Digital Equipment Corporation who were frustrated with DEC's management and left to form their own company. The chief founders were Edson de Castro, Henry Burkhardt III, and Richard Sogge of Digital Equipment (DEC), and Herbert Richman of Fairchild Semiconductor. The company was founded in Hudson, Massachusetts, in 1968. Harvey Newquist was hired from Computer Control Corporation to oversee manufacturing.

Edson de Castro was the chief engineer in charge of the PDP-8, DEC's line of inexpensive computers that created the minicomputer market. It was designed specifically to be used in laboratory equipment settings; as the technology improved, it was reduced in size to fit into a 19-inch rack. Many PDP-8s still operated decades later in these roles. De Castro was watching developments in manufacturing, especially more complex printed circuit boards (PCBs) and wave soldering that suggested that the PDP-8 could be produced much more inexpensively. DEC was not interested, having turned its attention increasingly to the high-end market. Convinced he could improve the process, De Castro began work on his own low-cost 16-bit design.

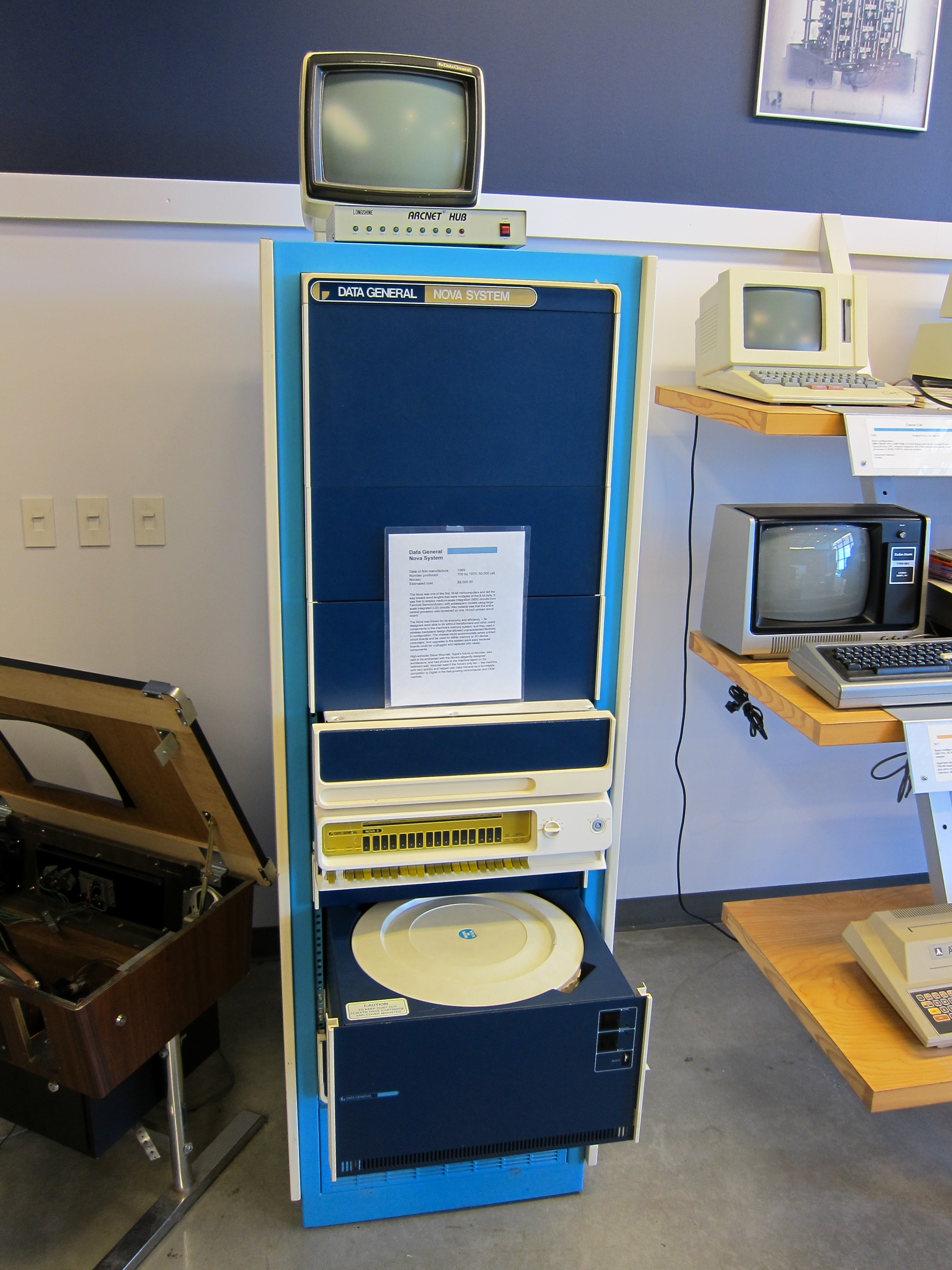
Data General Nova System

The result was released in 1969 by Data General as the Nova. The Nova, like the PDP-8, used a simple accumulator-based architecture. It lacked general registers and the stack-pointer functionality of the more advanced PDP-11, as did competing products, such as the HP 1000; compilers used hardware-based memory locations in lieu of a stack pointer. Designed to be rack-mounted similarly to the later PDP-8 machines, it was packaged on four PCB cards and was thus smaller in height, while also including a number of features that made it run considerably faster. Announced as "the best small computer in the world", the Nova quickly gained a following, especially in scientific and educational markets, and made the company flush with cash. DEC sued for misappropriation of its trade secrets, but this ultimately went nowhere. With the initial success of the Nova, Data General went public in the fall of 1969.

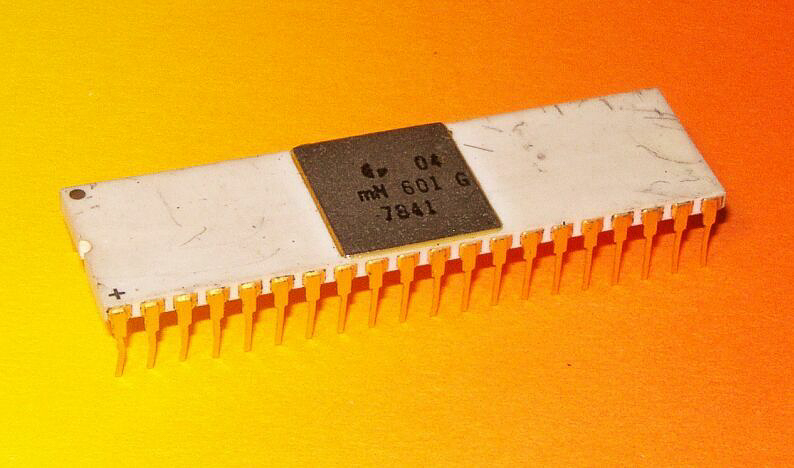
Data General mN601G, used in the microNova

The original Nova was soon followed by the faster SuperNova, which replaced the Nova's 4-bit arithmetic logic unit (ALU) with a 16-bit version that made the machine roughly four times as fast. Several variations and upgrades to the SuperNova core followed. The last major version, the Nova 4, was released in 1978. During this period the Nova generated 20% annual growth rates for the company, becoming a star in the business community and generating US$ 100 million in sales in 1975. In 1977, DG launched a 16-bit microcomputer called the microNOVA to poor commercial success. The Nova series played a very important role as instruction-set inspiration to Charles P. Thacker and others at Xerox PARC during their construction of the Xerox Alto.

=== Late 1970s to late 1980s: crisis and a short term solution ===
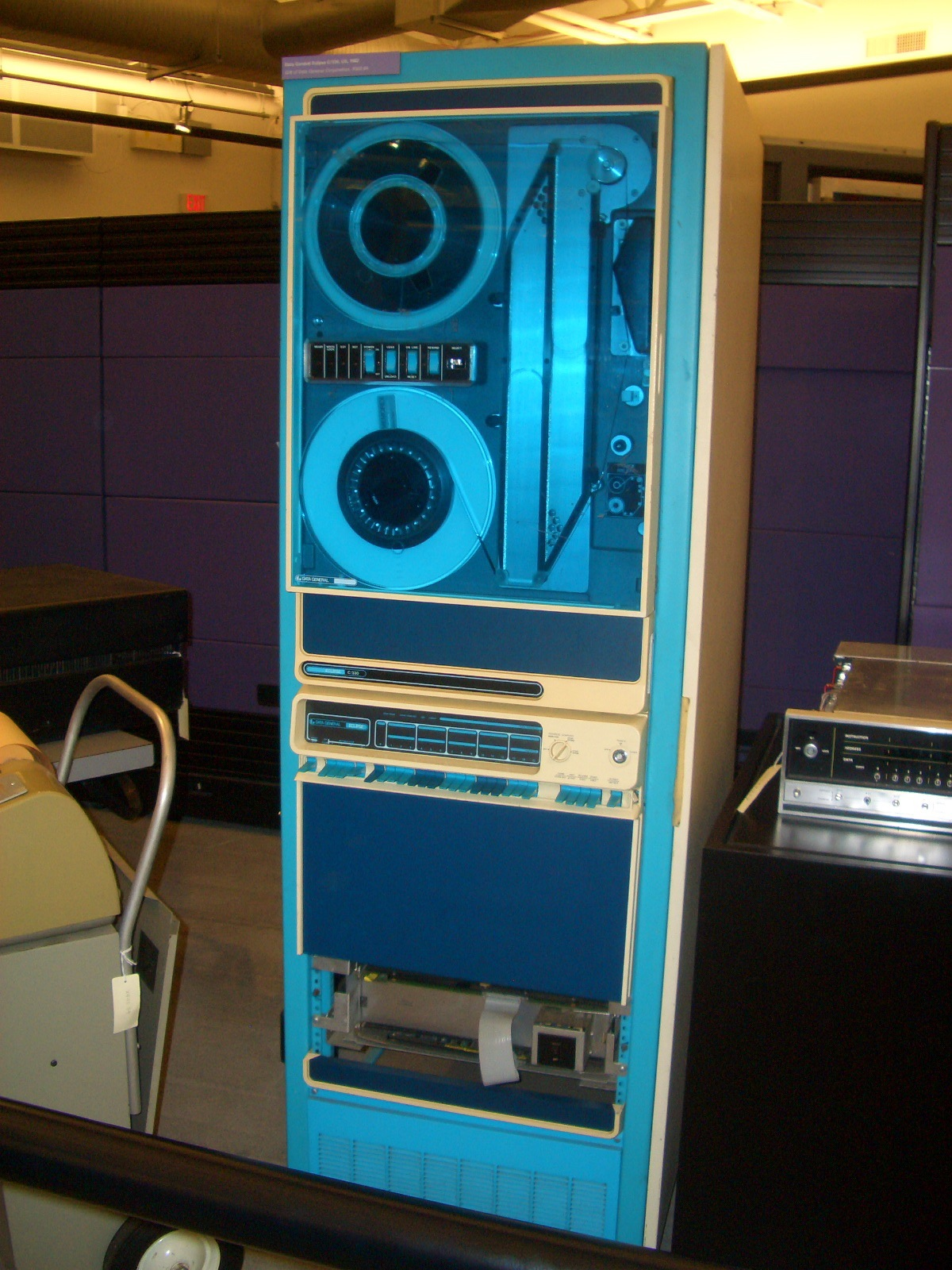
Data General Eclipse C/330

In 1974, the Nova was supplanted by their upscale 16-bit machine, the Eclipse. Based on many of the same concepts as the Nova, it added support for virtual memory and multitasking more suitable to the small office environment.

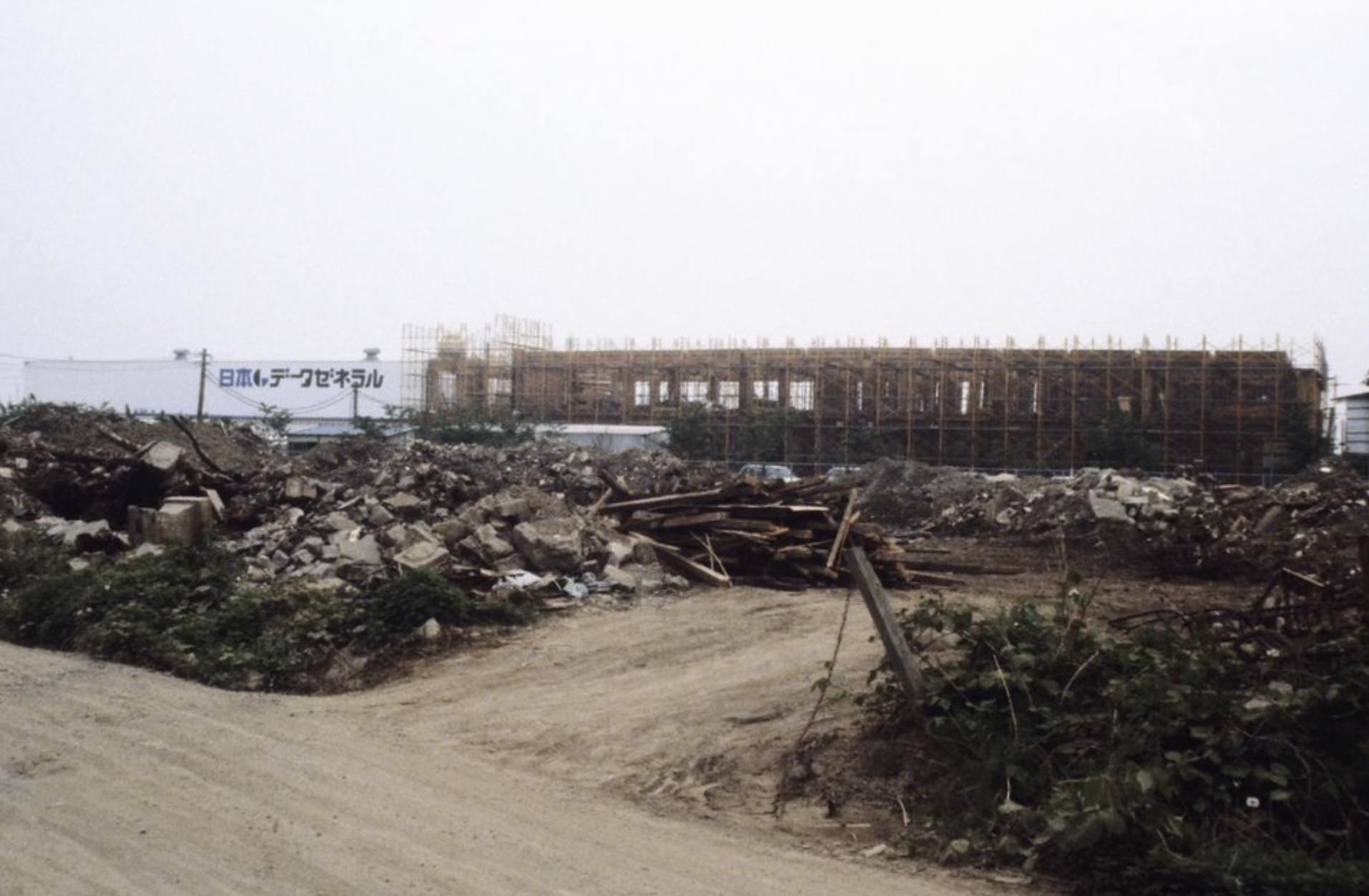
Data General factory being built in Japan, c. 1979

Production problems with the Eclipse led to a rash of lawsuits in the late 1970s. Newer versions of the machine were pre-ordered by many of DG's customers, which were never delivered. Many customers sued Data General after more than a year of waiting, charging the company with breach of contract, while others simply canceled their orders and went elsewhere. The Eclipse was originally intended to replace the Nova outright, evidenced by the fact that the Nova 3 series, released at the same time and utilizing virtually the same internal architecture as the Eclipse, was phased out the next year. Strong demand continued for the Nova series, resulting in the Nova 4, perhaps as a result of the continuing problems with the Eclipse.

=== Fountainhead ===
While DG was still struggling with Eclipse, in 1977, Digital announced the VAX series, their first 32-bit minicomputer line, described as "super-minis". This coincided with the aging of DEC's 16-bit products, notably the PDP-11, which were coming due for replacement. It appeared there was an enormous potential market for 32-bit machines, one that DG might be able to "scoop".

Data General immediately launched their own 32-bit effort in 1976 to build what they called the "world's best 32-bit machine", known internally as the "Fountainhead Project", or FHP for short (Fountain Head Project). Development took place off-site so that even DG workers would not know of it. The developers were given free rein over the design and selected a system that used a writable instruction set. The idea was that the instruction set architecture (ISA) was not fixed, programs could write their own ISA and upload it as microcode to the processor's writable control store. This would allow the ISA to be tailored to the programs being run, for instance, one might upload an ISA tuned for COBOL if the company's workload included significant numbers of COBOL programs.

When Digital's VAX-11/780 was shipped in February 1978, however, Fountainhead was not yet ready to deliver a machine, due mainly to problems in project management. DG's customers left quickly for the VAX world.

==== Eagle ====
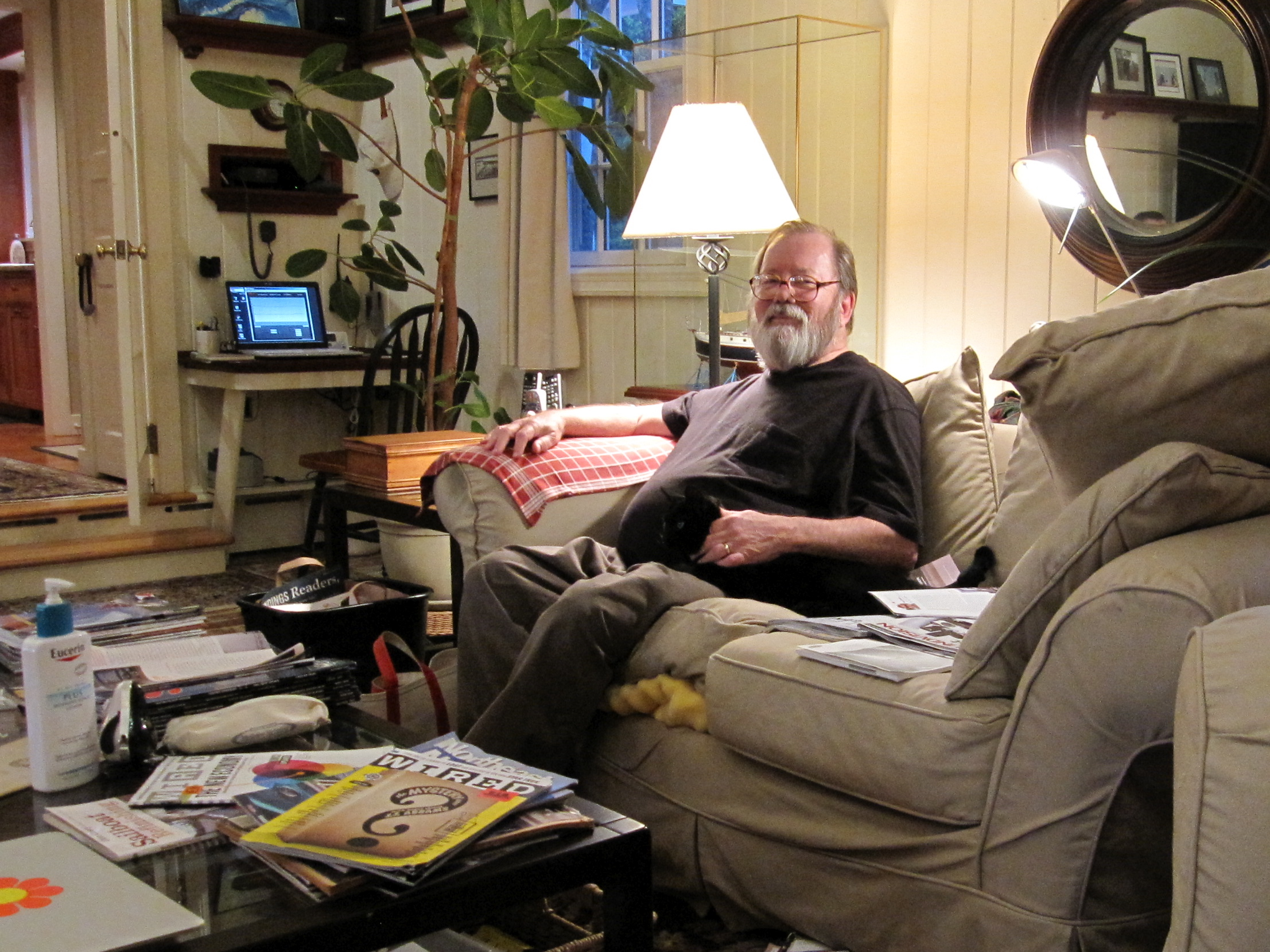
Tom West (as seen in 2009)

In the spring of 1978, with Fountainhead apparently in development hell, a secret skunkworks project was started to develop an alternative 32-bit system known as "Eagle" by a team led by Tom West. References to "the Eagle project" and "Project Eagle" co-exist. Eagle was a straightforward, 32-bit extension of the Nova-based Eclipse. It was backwards-compatible with 16-bit Eclipse applications, used the same command-line interpreter, but offered improved 32-bit performance over the VAX 11/780 while using fewer components.

By late 1979, it became clear that Eagle would deliver before Fountainhead, igniting an intense turf war within the company for constantly shrinking project funds. In the meantime, customers were abandoning Data General in droves, driven not only by the delivery problems with the original Eclipse, including very serious quality control and customer service problems, but also the power and versatility of Digital's new VAX line. Ultimately, Fountainhead was cancelled and Eagle became the new MV series, with the first model, the Data General Eclipse MV/8000, announced in April 1980.

The Eagle Project was the subject of Tracy Kidder's Pulitzer Prize-winning book, The Soul of a New Machine, making the MV line the best-documented computer project in recent history.

=== MV series ===
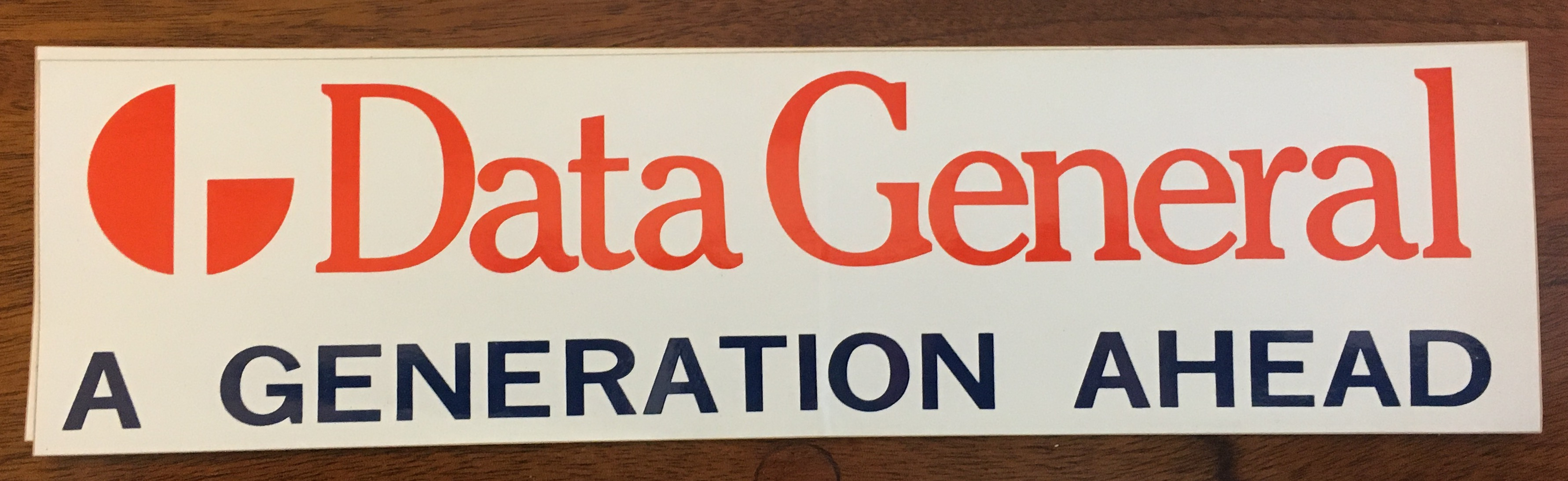
Bumper sticker with the company's slogan from the early 1980s

The MV systems generated an almost miraculous turnaround for Data General. Through the early 1980s sales picked up, and by 1984 the company had over a billion dollars in annual sales.

One of Data General's significant customers at this time was the United States Forest Service, which starting in the mid-1980s used DG systems installed at all levels from headquarters in Washington, D.C., down to individual ranger stations and fire command posts. This required equipment of high reliability and generally rugged construction that could be deployed in a wide range of places, often to be maintained and used by people with no computer background at all. The intent was to create new kinds of functional integration in an agency that had long prized its decentralized structure. Despite some tensions, the implementation was effective and the overall effects on the agency notably positive. The introduction, implementation, and effects of the DG systems in USFS were documented in a series of evaluative reports prepared in the late 1980s by the RAND Corporation.

The MV series came in various iterations, from the MV/2000 (later MV/2500), MV/4000, MV/10000, MV/15000, MV/20000, MV/30000, MV/40000 and ultimately concluded with the MV/60000HA minicomputer. The MV/60000HA was intended to be a High Availability system, with many components duplicated to eliminate the single point of failure.

=== Software ===
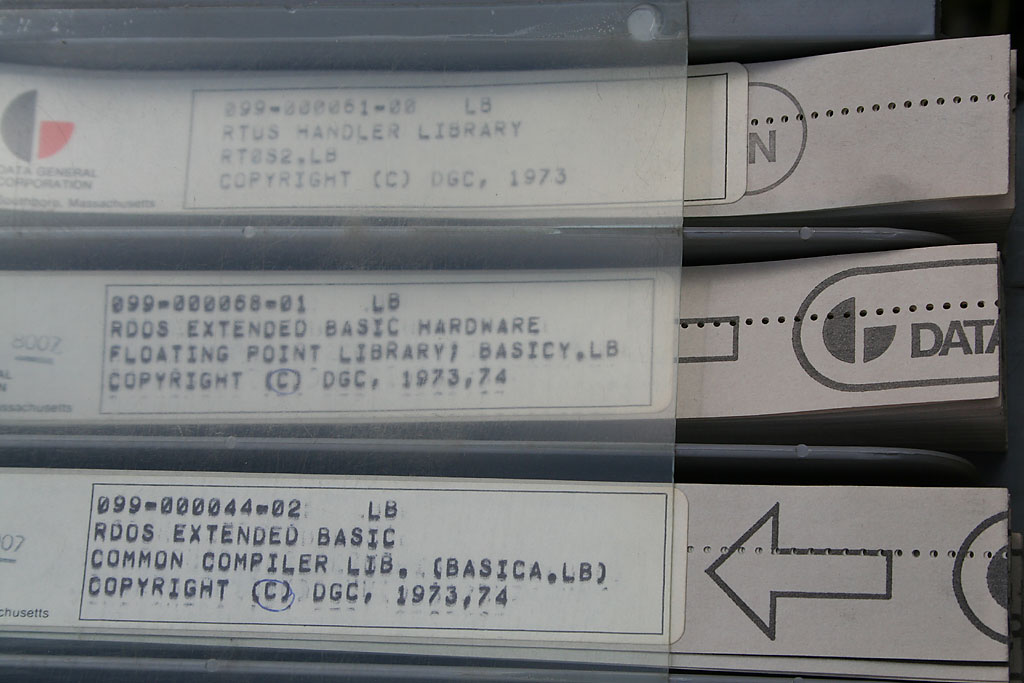
Data General software as released on paper tape, 1973–74

Data General developed operating systems for its hardware: DOS and RDOS for the Nova, RDOS and AOS for the 16-bit Eclipse C, M, and S lines, AOS/VS and AOS/VS II for the Eclipse MV line, and a modified version of UNIX System V called DG/UX for the Eclipse MV and AViiON machines. The AOS/VS software was the most commonly used DG software product and included CLI (Command Line Interpreter) allowing for complex scripting, DUMP/LOAD, and other custom components.

Related system software also in common use at the time included such packages as X.25, Xodiac, and TCP/IP for networking, Fortran, COBOL, RPG, PL/I, C and Data General Business Basic for programming, INFOS II and DG/DBMS for databases, and the nascent relational database software DG/SQL.

Data General also offered an office automation suite named Comprehensive Electronic Office (CEO), which included a mail system, a calendar, a folder-based document store, a word processor (CEOWrite), a spreadsheet processor, and other assorted tools. All were crude by today's standards, but were revolutionary for their time. CEOWrite was also offered on the DG One Portable.

Some software development from the early 1970s is notable. PLN (created by Robert Nichols) was the host language for a number of DG products, making them easier to develop, enhance, and maintain than macro assembler equivalents. PLN smacked of a micro-subset of PL/I, in sharp contrast to other languages of the time, such as BLISS. The RPG product (shipped in 1976) incorporated a language runtime system implemented as a virtual machine which executed pre-compiled code as sequences of PLN statements and Eclipse commercial instruction routines. The latter provided microcode acceleration of arithmetic and conversion operations for a wide range of now-arcane data types such as overpunch characters. The DG Easy product, a portable application platform developed by Nichols and others from 1975 to 1979 but never marketed, had roots easily traceable back to the RPG VM created by Stephen Schleimer.

Also notable were several commercial software products developed in the mid to late 1970s in conjunction with the commercial computers. These products were popular with business customers because of their screen design feature and other ease-of-use features.

- The first product was IDEA (Interactive Data Entry/Access), which consisted of a screen design tool (IFMT), TP Controller (IMON), and a program development language (IFPL).
- The second was the CS40 line of products, which used COBOL and their own ISAM data manager. The COBOL variant used included an added screen section. Both of these products were a major departure from the transaction monitors of the day which did not have a screen design tool and used subroutine calls from COBOL to handle the screen. IDEA was identified by some market watchers as a precursor to fourth-generation programming languages.

The original IDEA ran on RDOS and would support up to 24 users in an RDOS Partition. Each user could use the same or a different program. Eventually, IDEA ran on every commercial hardware product from the MicroNova (4 users) to the MV series under AOS/VS, the same IDEA program running all those systems. The CS40 (the first of this line) was a package system which supported four terminal users, each running a different COBOL program.

- These products also led to the development of a third product, TPMS (Transaction Processing Monitoring System (announced in 1980)) which could capably run a large number of COBOL or PL/I users with a smaller number of processors, a major resource and performance advantage on AOS and AOS/VS systems. TPMS had the same screen design tool as the earlier products. TPMS used defined subroutine calls for screen functions from COBOL or PL/I, which in some users' eyes made it more difficult to use. However, this product was aimed at the professional IS Programmers as were its competitors—IBM's CICS and DEC's TRAX. As with IDEA, TPMS used INFOS for information management and DG/DBMS for database management.

=== Xodiac ===
In 1979, DG introduced their Xodiac networking system. This was based on the X.25 standard at the lower levels, and their own application layer protocols on top. Because it was based on X.25, remote sites could be linked together over commercial X.25 services like Telenet in the US or Datapac in Canada. Data General software packages supporting Xodiac included Comprehensive Electronic Office (CEO).

In June 1987, Data General announced its intention to replace Xodiac with the Open Systems Interconnection (OSI) protocol suite.

=== Dasher terminals ===
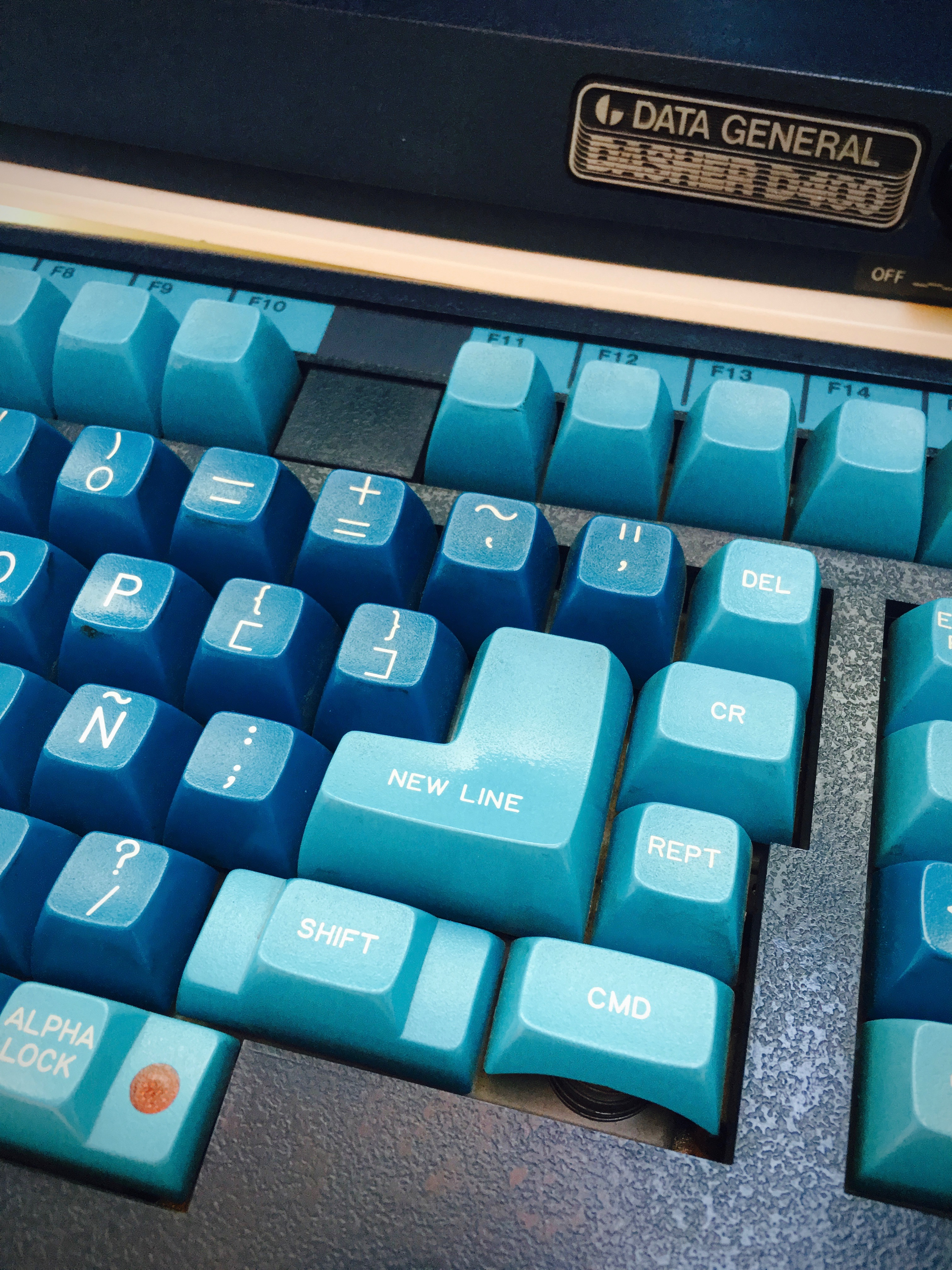
Dasher D400 keyboard

Data General produced a full range of peripherals, sometimes by rebadging printers for example, but Data General's own series of CRT-based and hard-copy terminals were high quality and featured a generous number of function keys, each with the ability to send different codes, with any combination of control and shift keys, which influenced WordPerfect design. The model 6053 Dasher 2 featured an easily tilted screen, but used many integrated circuits; the smaller, lighter D100, D200 and eventually the D210 replaced it as the basic user terminal, while graphics models such as the D460 (with ANSI X3.64 compatibility) occupied the very high end of the range. Terminal emulators for the D2/D3/D100/D200/D210 (and some features of the D450/460) do exist, including the Freeware 1993 DOS program in D460.zip.

Most Data General software was written specifically for their own terminals (or the terminal emulation built into the Desktop Generation DG10, but the Data General One built-in terminal emulator is not often suitable. Although software using Data General Business BASIC could be more flexible in terminal handling, because logging into a Business BASIC system would initiate a process whereby the terminal type would (usually) be auto-detected.

=== Data General/One ===
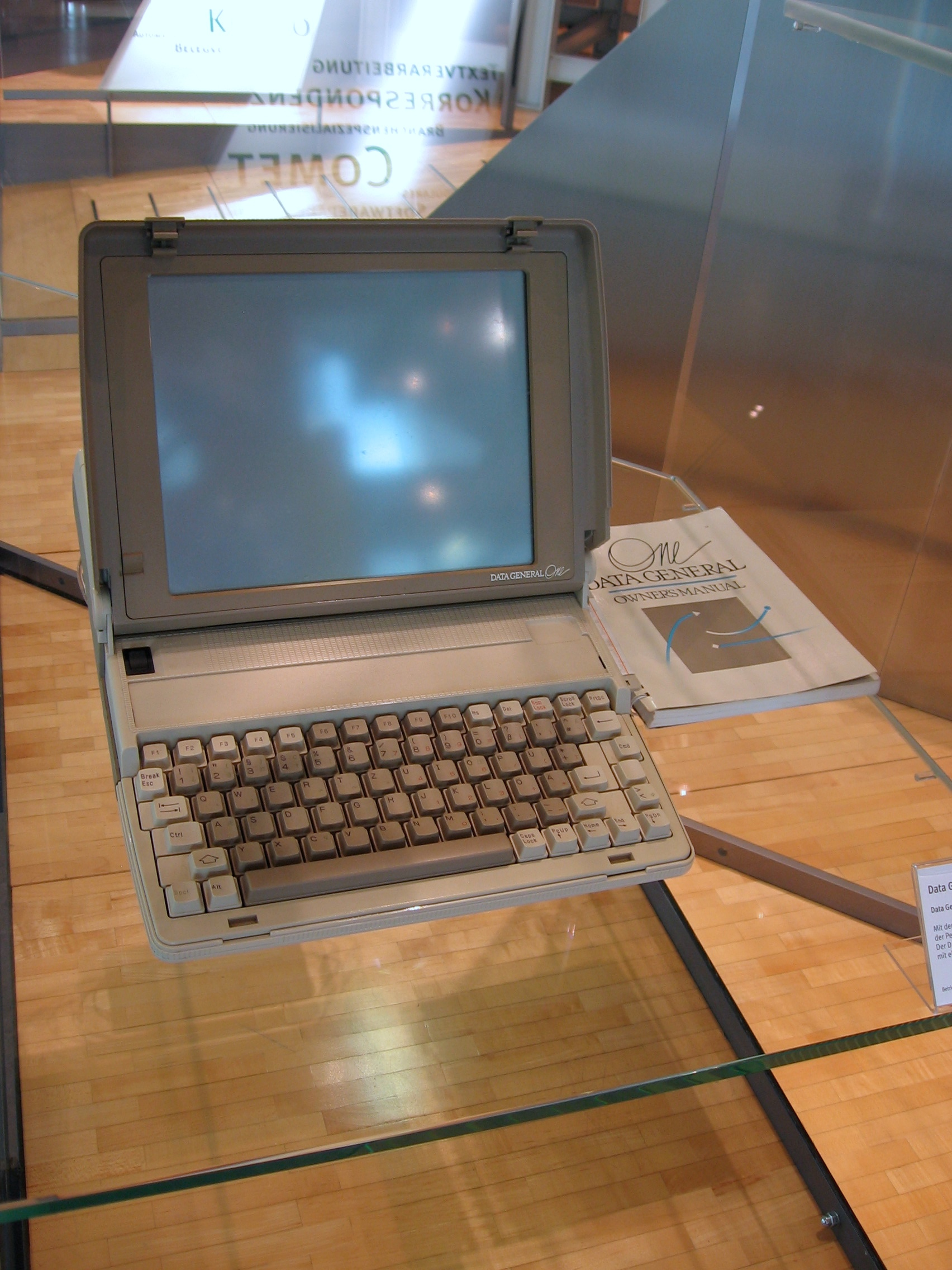
Data General One

Data General's introduction of the Data General/One (DG-1) in 1984 is one of the few cases of a minicomputer company introducing a truly breakthrough PC product. Considered genuinely portable, rather than "luggable", as alternatives often were called, it was a nine-pound battery-powered MS-DOS machine equipped with dual 3 1/2-inch diskettes, a 79-key full-stroke keyboard, 128 KB to 512 KB of RAM, and a monochrome LCD screen capable of either the full-sized standard 80×25 characters or full CGA graphics (640×200). The DG-1 was considered a modest advance over similar Osborne/Kaypro systems overall.

=== Desktop Generation ===
Data General also brought out a small-footprint "Desktop Generation" range, starting with the DG10 that included both Data General and Intel CPUs in a patented closely coupled arrangement, able to run MS-DOS or CP/M-86 concurrently with DG/RDOS, with each benefiting from the hardware acceleration given by other CPU as a co-processor that would handle (for instance) screen graphics or disk operations concurrently. Other members of the Desktop Generation range, the DG20 and DG30, were aimed more at traditional commercial environments, such as multi-user COBOL systems, replacing refrigerator-sized minicomputers with toaster-sized modular microcomputers based around the microECLIPSE CPUs and some of the technology developed for the microNOVA-based "Micro Products" range such as the MP/100 and MP/200 that had struggled to find a market niche. The Single-processor version of the DG10, the DG10SP, was the entry-level machine with, like the DG20 and 30, no ability to run Intel software. Despite having some good features and having less direct competition from the flood of cheap PC compatibles, the Desktop Generation range also struggled, partly because they offered an economical way of running what was essentially "legacy software" while the future was clearly either slightly cheaper Personal Computers or slightly more expensive "super minicomputers" such as the MV and VAX computers.

=== Lock-in or no lock-in? ===
Throughout the 1980s, the computer market had evolved dramatically. Large installations in the past typically ran custom-developed software for a small range of tasks. For instance, IBM often delivered machines whose only purpose was to generate accounting data for a single company, running software tailored for that company alone.

By the mid-1980s, the introduction of new software development methods and the rapid acceptance of the SQL database was changing the way such software was developed. Now developers typically linked together several pieces of existing software, as opposed to developing everything from scratch. In this market, the question of which machine was the "best" changed; it was no longer the machine with the best price–performance ratio or service contracts, but the one that ran all of the third-party software the customer intended to use.

This change forced changes on the hardware vendors as well. Formerly, almost all computer companies attempted to make their machines different enough that when their customers sought a more powerful machine, it was often cheaper to buy another from the same company. This was known as "vendor lock-in", which helped guarantee future sales, even though the customers detested it.

With the change in software development, combined with new generations of commodity processors that could match the performance of low-end minicomputers, lock-in was no longer working. When forced to make a decision, it was often cheaper for the users to simply throw out all of their existing machinery and buy a microcomputer product instead. If this was not the case at present, it certainly appeared it would be within a generation or two of Moore's law.

Around 1987, Data General started to focus on commodities due to not having enough production volume to compete with merchant semi-conductor houses.

In 1988, two company directors put together a report showing that if the company were to continue existing in the future, DG would have to either invest heavily in software to compete with new applications being delivered by IBM and DEC on their machines, or alternately exit the proprietary hardware business entirely.

=== AViiON ===
De Castro agreed with the report, and future generations of the MV series were terminated. Instead, DG released a technically interesting series of Unix servers known as the AViiON. The name "AViiON" was a reversed play on the name of DG's first product, Nova, implying "Nova II". In an effort to keep costs down, the AViiON was originally designed and shipped with the Motorola 88000 RISC processor. The AViiON machines supported multi-processing, later evolving into NUMA-based systems, allowing the machines to scale upwards in performance by adding additional processors.

=== CLARiiON ===
An important element in all enterprise computer systems is high speed storage. At the time AViiON came to market, commodity hard disk drives could not offer the sort of performance needed for data center use. DG attacked this problem in the same fashion as the processor issue, by running a large number of drives in parallel. The overall performance was greatly improved and the resulting innovation was marketed originally as the HADA (High Availability Disk Array) and then later as the CLARiiON line. The CLARiiON arrays, which offered SCSI RAID in various capacities, offered a great price/performance and platform flexibility over competing solutions.

The CLARiiON line was marketed not only to AViiON and Data General MV series customers, but also to customers running servers from other vendors such as Sun Microsystems, Hewlett-Packard and Silicon Graphics. Data General also embarked on a plan to hire storage sales specialists and to challenge the EMC Symmetrix in the wider market.

=== Joint venture with Soviet company ===
On December 12, 1989, DG and Soviet Union software developer NPO Parma announced Perekat (Перекат, “Rolling Thunder,”) the first joint venture between an American computer company and a Soviet company. DG would provide hardware and NPO Parma the software, and Austrian companies Voest Alpine Industrieanlagenbau and their marketing group Voest Alpine Vertriebe would build the plant.

=== Final downturn ===
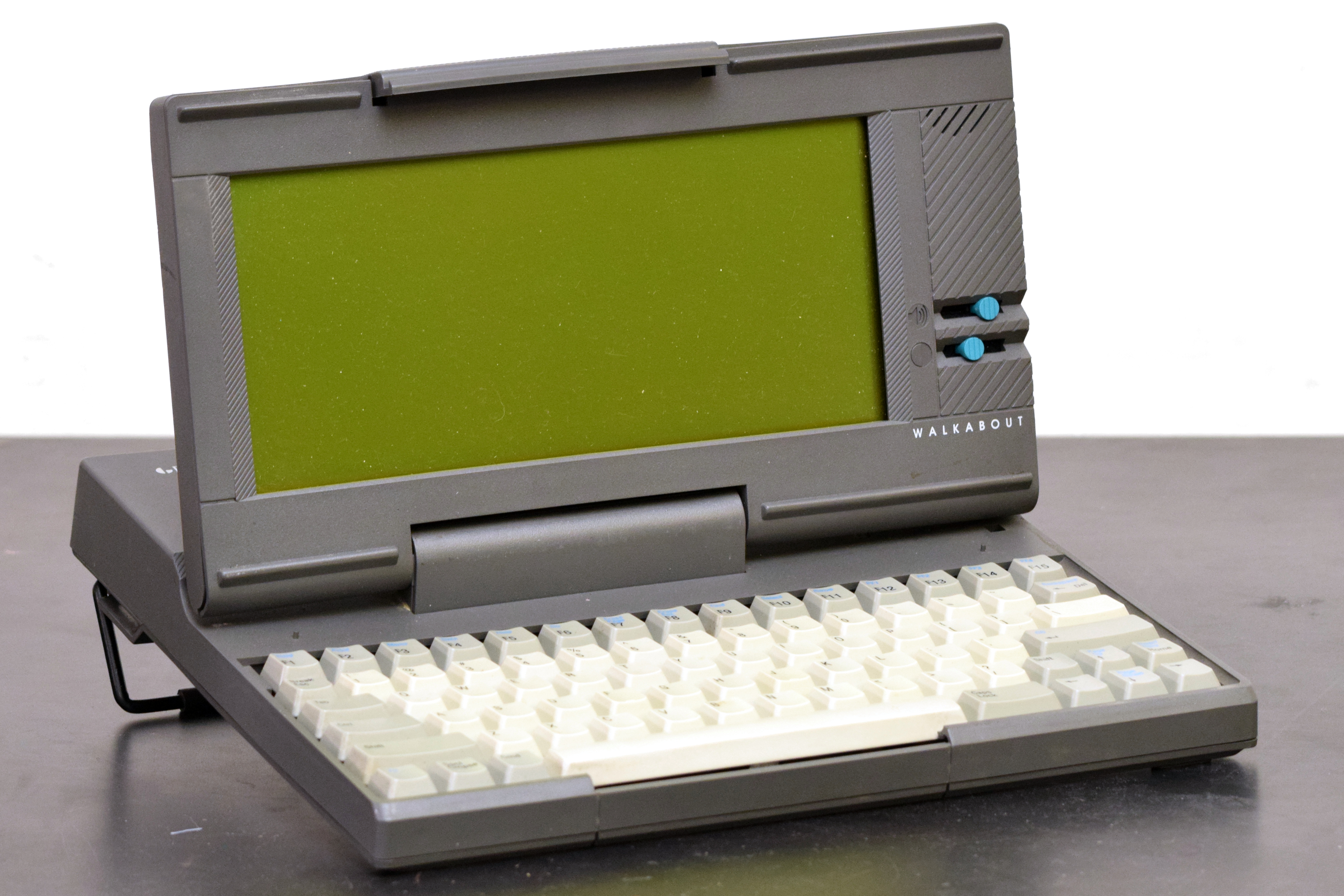
Data General Walkabout, notebook computer/portable terminal from the turn of the 1990s

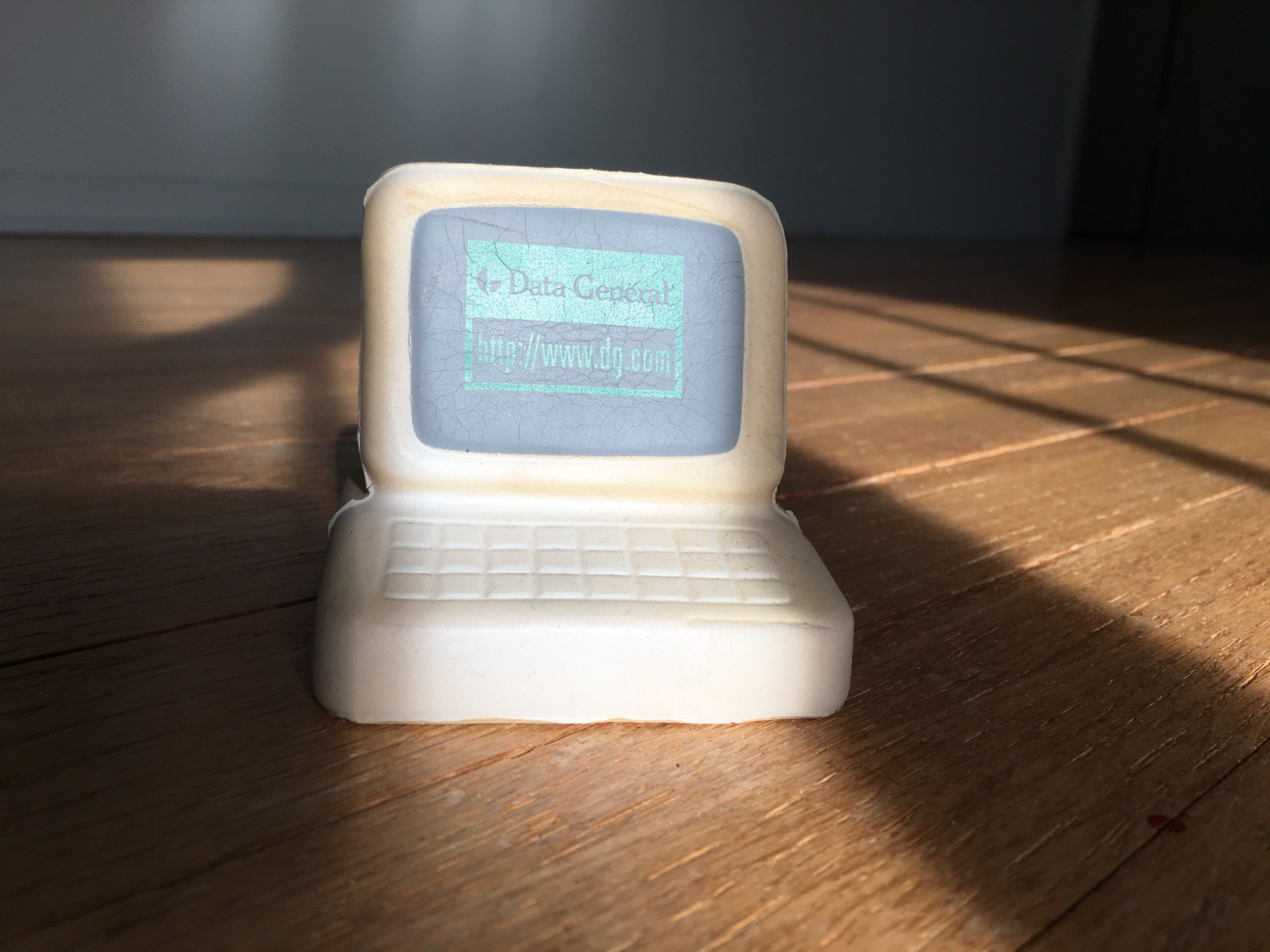
Promotional item c. mid-1990s

Despite Data General's betting the AViiON farm on the Motorola 88000, Motorola decided to end production of that CPU. The 88000 had never been very successful, and DG was the only major customer. When Apple Computer and IBM proposed their joint solution based on POWER architecture, the PowerPC, Motorola picked up the manufacturing contract and killed the 88000.

DG quickly responded by introducing new models of the AViiON series based on a true commodity processor, the Intel x86 series. By this time a number of other vendors, notably Sequent Computer Systems, were also introducing similar machines. The lack of lock-in now came back to haunt DG, and the rapid commoditization of the Unix market led to shrinking sales. DG did begin a minor shift toward the service industry, training their technicians for the role of implementing a spate of new x86-based servers and the new Microsoft Windows NT domain-driven, small server world. This never developed enough to offset the loss of high margin server business however.

Data General also targeted the explosion of the internet in the latter 1990s with the formation of the THiiN Line business unit, led by Tom West, which had a focus on creation and sale of so-called "internet appliances". The product developed was called the SiteStak web server appliance and was designed as an inexpensive website hosting product.

=== EMC takeover ===
CLARiiON was the only product line that saw continued success through the later 1990s after finding a large niche for Unix storage systems, and its sales were still strong enough to make DG a takeover target. EMC, the 800-pound gorilla in the storage market, announced in August 1999 that they would buy Data General and its assets for $1.1 billion or $19.58 a share. The acquisition was completed on October 12, 1999.

Although details of the acquisition specified that EMC had to take the entire company, and not just the storage line, EMC quickly ended all development and production of DG computer hardware and parts, effectively ending Data General's presence in the segment. The maintenance business was sold to a third party, who also acquired all of DG's remaining hardware components for spare parts sales to old DG customers. The CLARiiON line continued to be a major player in the market and was marketed under that name until January 2012. CLARiiON was also widely sold by Dell through a worldwide OEM deal with EMC. The Clariion and Celerra storage products evolved into EMC's unified storage platform, the VNX platform.

Data General would be only one of many New England based computer companies, including the original Digital Equipment Corporation, that collapsed or were sold to larger companies after the 1980s. On the Internet, even the old Data General domain (dg.com), which contained a few EMC webpages that only mentioned the latter company in passing, was sold to the Dollar General discount department store chain in October 2009.

== Marketing ==
Data General exhibited a brash style of marketing and advertising, which acted to set the company in the spotlight. A memorable advertising campaign during the early 1980s Desktop Generation era, was issuance of T-shirts with the logo "We did it on a desktop". The early AViiON servers were portrayed as powerful computing in the size of a pizza box.

Data General sponsored the Tyrrell Formula 1 team in the Formula 1 World Championships in 1985, 1986 and 1987, with prominent placing on the team's 014, 015 and DG016 cars. The DG016 used in 1987 was prefixed DG in deference to Data General.

== Alumni ==
- DJ Delorie designed PC motherboards and BIOS code for Data General for four years. He authored DJGPP, and as of 2019 works for Red Hat on GCC.
- Peter Darnell was a developer of DG/L and went on to develop C compilers for Unix and Windows. He wrote a book on C and is the developer of the visual programming language VisSim by Visual Solutions.
- Jean-Louis Gassée was with Data General in France before moving to Apple Computer and Be Inc.
- Ronald H. Gruner was head of Data General's Fountainhead project which competed with the MV/8000. After leaving DG he co-founded Alliant Computer Systems along with former DG colleague Craig Mundie.
- David C. Mahoney founded Banyan Systems and pioneered Local Area network technologies in late 1980s along with Novell.
- Craig Mundie was a software developer at Data General and later became Chief Technologist at Microsoft.
- Mike Nash worked on AOS/VS kernel virtual terminal services for PCI and was a Corporate Vice President at Microsoft and is currently Vice President, Consumer PC & Solutions, Printing and Personal Systems Group, Hewlett-Packard Company.
- Ray Ozzie was a software developer at Data General. He subsequently worked for Software Arts, Lotus Development, Iris Associates, and Groove Networks. Groove Networks was acquired by Microsoft in 2005, and Ozzie replaced Bill Gates as chief software architect at Microsoft from 2006 until 2010.
- Jonathan Sachs co-founded Lotus Development where he authored 1-2-3.
- Jit Saxena founded Netezza, search technology company
- Christopher Stone founded Object Management Group (created CORBA) and became vice chairman/CEO of Novell.
- Asher Waldfogel was a software engineer in Special Systems (software) who later went on to found Redback Networks, Tollbridge Technologies and PeakStream.
- Steve Wallach cofounded Convex Computer.
- Joshua Weiss was a manager in the Xodiac Networking group who went on to co-found Prominet (bought by Lucent Technologies) and later was founder and CEO of Nauticus (bought by Sun Microsystems).
- Vernon Weiss was a manager in the portable computing group who led the development of the Data General/One, the Data General/Two, and the Data General Walkabout. He was later a key person in the creation of the XPS family of personal computers at Dell and was the director of the personal computing division at Packard Bell and a product manager at Northgate Computer Systems.
- Tom West was the manager for the MV/8000 and later projects. He was the main protagonist of the Pulitzer Prize winning 1981 non-fiction book The Soul of a New Machine.
- Edward Zander was product marketing manager at Data General before his positions at Apollo Computer, Sun Microsystems and Motorola as CEO.
- Wayne Rosing was hardware manager of Special Systems (hardware) who left to design the Lisa workstation for Apple. Though not a commercial success, stripped down it became the Macintosh. Rosing later went to Sun Microsystems where he was Vice President of Advanced Development, appearing on the cover of Fortune magazine. He retired as VP of Hardware at Google.
- George Woltman went on to found the Great Internet Mersenne Prime Search (GIMPS) and is the author of Prime95 (which is used to search for Mersenne Prime numbers and for hardware stress testing.)
