= Vernon Weiss =

American computer systems engineer (born 1951)

Vernon Weiss (born 1951) is a retired American computer systems engineer.

Weiss was a key person in the development of the XPS family of personal computers at Dell and was the director of the personal computing division Packard Bell and a product manager at Northgate Computer Systems.

During his early years in the computer industry, Vernon Weiss worked at Data General as the product manager for the Data General PC group. He was involved with the Data General/One, Two and the Data General Walkabout.
