= Avant Stellar =

Computer keyboard

The Avant Stellar is a mechanical keyboard that was produced by Creative Vision Technologies Inc (CVT). It was the successor to the popular and successful OmniKey keyboard by Northgate Computers, and was regarded as being very similar to the OmniKey Plus. It is no longer in production.
