= Data General Walkabout =

Series of laptops by Data General

Walkabout
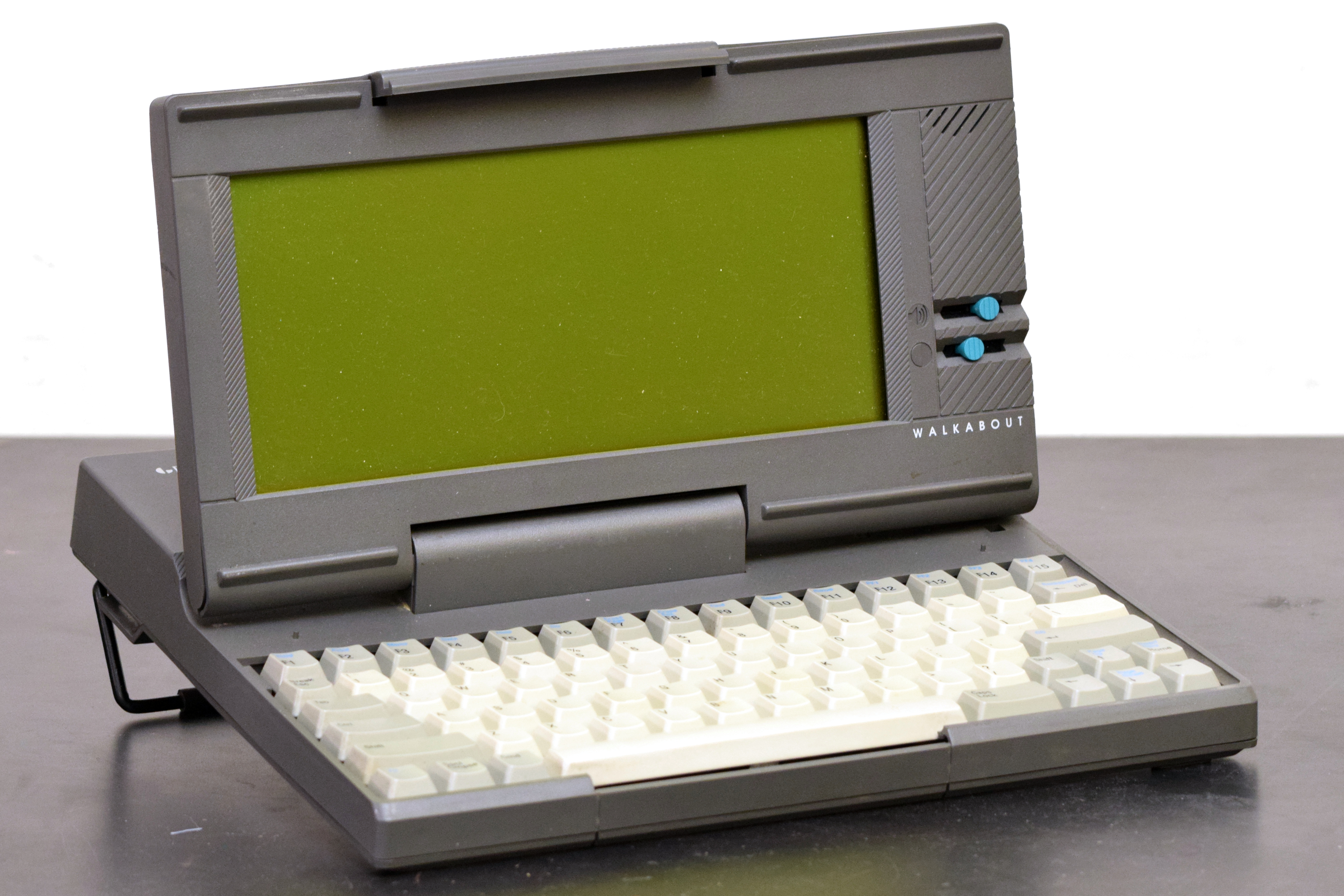
- First generation Walkabout
- Developer: Data General; Vernon Weiss
- Manufacturer: Data General
- Type: Notebook computer; Portable terminal (1st generation)
- Released: December 1989; 36 years ago
- Lifespan: 1989–1993
- Discontinued: 1993; 33 years ago

The Walkabout is a family of notebook-sized laptops introduced by Data General in 1989 and discontinued in 1993. The first entry in the line, simply named the Walkabout, was a battery-powered portable terminal capable of emulating multiple protocols; as well, it contains a rudimentary word processor, an autodialer utility for placing phone calls, and a real-time clock display and timer application for setting reminders. The successor to the first model, the Walkabout/SX, released in 1990, was an architectural redesign allowing the laptop to be used as a general-purpose IBM PC compatible. The penultimate entry, the Walkabout/320, increased its predecessor's i386SX processor clock speed from 16 MHz to 20 MHz, while the last entry in the line, the Walkabout/386SL, replaced the processor with Intel's portable-centric i386SL processor clocked at 25 MHz.

== Development ==
Development of the Walkabout began in the mid-1980s, with Vernon Weiss leading the design team as Data General's portable product manager. Weiss was also responsible for leading the team behind the Data General/One, one of the first IBM PC–compatible laptops on the market. Weiss and the design team conceived of the original Walkabout as a portable email client: a device which would allow users to check their emails remotely via modem. Therefore, the computer was made a portable terminal instead of a general-purpose personal computer.

== Specifications ==
=== 1st generation ===
Introduced in December 1989, the original Walkabout has a built-in modem capable of communicating at speeds of either 1,200 baud or 2,400 baud, depending on the model ordered. It is capable of emulating Data General's own Dasher D216 protocol, as well as DEC's VT100 protocol and Lear Siegler's ADM-3A protocol. Aside from its terminal emulation functionality, the original Walkabout contains in ROM a rudimentary word processor application, capable of composing and storing up to 16 KB of text. An autodialer utility allows users to store contact information in a virtual phone book and automatically dial out one's phone number over the public switched telephone network via its modem. The laptop also includes a real-time clock application that displays the time in the corner of the screen, as well as a timer function allowing users to set timed reminders over the course of using the machine.

The original Walkabout, with its non-backlit monochrome LCD, measures 12 by 10.6 by 1.9 inches (30.5 by 26.9 by 4.8 cm) and weighs 5 pounds (2.3 kg). The Walkabout takes five AA batteries to operate; alternatively, users could have bought a rechargeable Ni–Cd battery pack to power the system.

=== Walkabout/SX ===
The Walkabout/SX, introduced in March 1990, was a radical departure from its predecessor, measuring larger and heavier than the original Walkabout while giving it true IBM PC compatibility through the adoption of Intel's i386SX processor, a 3.5-inch, high-density floppy disk drive, a VGA display, and a standard IBM PC–compatible chipset and BIOS. A 40-MB hard disk drive came standard, as did Microsoft's MS-DOS 4.1 and GW-BASIC on floppy disk. Sony and Conner Peripherals respectively manufactured the floppy and hard drives (the latter a CP3044 model hard drive), while Chips and Technologies, Cirrus Logic, and Phoenix Technologies respectively supplied the chipset, the GPU and BIOS ROM. A slot on the motherboard allows an 80387 math coprocessor to be installed by the user. The i386SX processor operates at its fullest 16-MHz clock speed only when connected to wall power; when powered off the battery, the clock speed is cut in half. This was a power conservation feature on the part of Data General.

The laptop comes with 1 MB of RAM stock, expandable to up to 8 MB with the use of SIMM slots on the motherboard, in increments of 1 MB or 2 MB. Two proprietary expansion slots on the side take Data General's proprietary expansion cards for the machine. One slot is reserved for 8-bit cards, while the other is for 16-bit cards. Available in 1990 were a 2400-baud modem card, a StarLAN Ethernet networking card, and a barcode reader card; in 1991, the company released an expansion chassis card, allowing ISA cards to be used with the Walkabout/SX. Data General also included two RS-232 serial ports and one parallel port on the back of the Walkabout/SX allowing common peripherals like mice and printers to be used with the laptop.

The Walkabout/SX's backlit VGA display measures 8.25 inches wide by 5.25 inches high, making for a somewhat irregular aspect ratio of 1.70:1, and can only display monochrome images, with 32 shades of grey. However, users can hook up an external monitor to obtain color display in a truer 1.33:1 aspect ratio.

The Walkabout/SX measures 15.7 by 14.2 by 3.2 inches (39.9 by 36.1 by 8.1 cm) and weighs, depending on the configuration, between 16 pounds (7.3 kg) and 22 pounds (10.0 kg). The computer's stock Ni–Cd battery lasts between three and five hours on a single charge. Power conservation features include the aforementioned underclocking on battery power, as well as automatic screen blanking and automatic hard drive shutoff TSR programs included on one of seven application floppy disks.

=== Walkabout/320 ===
The Walkabout/320, introduced in July 1991, was another radical redesign, reducing its weight to just under 6 pounds (2.7 kg) and measuring smaller across all dimensions, measuring 11 by 5 by 1.8 inches (27.9 by 12.7 by 4.6 cm), making for Data General's first notebook computer. The clock speed of the computer's i386SX was bumped up to 20 MHz, while the stock RAM was increased to 2 MB (although the memory ceiling was decreased to 6 MB). Data General offered the Walkabout/320 with a 60-MB Conner hard drive, as well as the same 40-MB Conner drive of its predecessor as a lower-cost alternative. Most other features were carried over from its predecessor.

=== Walkabout/386SL ===
The Walkabout/386SL, introduced in September 1992, was a slight revision over its predecessor, replacing the i386SX with the portable-oriented, power-saving i386SL processor—now clocked at 25 MHz. The 2 MB stock RAM and 6 MB RAM ceiling was retained, while the stock hard drive was increased to 60 MB. The new model also added a PC Card slot for improved expandability. The Walkabout/386SL, as well as the entire Walkabout line, was phased out in mid-to-late 1993.

== Sales ==
The original Walkabout sold slowly, according to Weiss, who wrote that, as a thin email client in the late 1980s, "[i]t was a great idea that was ahead of the hardware curve". In retrospect, Weiss deemed Data General's original asking price too expensive. Despite its lack of success in the marketplace, the Walkabout proved to be the conceptual prototype for mobile thin clients of the 2000s, such as Palm's cancelled Foleo and Hewlett-Packard's HP Compaq 6720t.

In July 1990, Data General won a $3.6 million order from Rockwell International's Allen-Bradley (AB) division to rebrand the Walkabout/SX as the Allen-Bradley T47. This incarnation of the laptop was remarketed by Allen-Bradley as a terminal for its line of programmable logic controllers (PLCs) for use in factory automation. Data General manufactured for AB a custom board slotting into one of the proprietary expansion slots a communications board, allowing it to interface with Allen-Bradley's 1784-KL PLC. As well, the T47 came preinstalled with AB's 6200 Series software.

== Reception ==
Robert D. Athey Jr., reviewing the Walkabout/SX in DG Review, found the computer overall comfortable to use and its processor speedier than advertised. He also gave the built-in LCD high marks for readability and graphical reproduction. Athey called the built-in floppy disk quite slow and found the keyboard occasionally intermittent, however. Van Van Horn, also writing about the Walkabout/SX in the same publication, deemed the computer heavier than most laptops on the market at the time (at 22 lb for his configuration) but found it nonetheless roadworthy and sturdy. Horn rated the laptop's PC compatibility well and found parallel communications with other computers speedy. Unlike Athey, Horn found the LCD mediocre in most reading environments except broad daylight. PC Magazine's Bruce Brown, reviewing the Walkabout/SX, concluded that while the average user would not want to transport the machine "back and forth every day or use it as a constant computing companion" due to its heft, the machine overall was "a viable portable candidate for those who want a full-featured machine".
