= George Woltman =

American mathematician

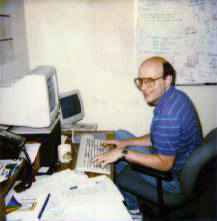
- George Woltman, computer scientist and noted prime number hobbyist, in 1993
- Born: November 10, 1957 (age 69)
- Education: Massachusetts Institute of Technology
- Known for: GIMPS, mprime/Prime95, gwnum
- Scientific career
- Fields: number theory, volunteer computing, computer science

George Woltman (born November 10, 1957) is the founder of the Great Internet Mersenne Prime Search (GIMPS), a distributed computing project researching Mersenne prime numbers using his software Prime95. He graduated from the Massachusetts Institute of Technology (MIT) with a BS and a MS in computer science. He lives in North Carolina.

His mathematical libraries (gwnum) created for the GIMPS project are the fastest known for multiplication of large integers on x86 and x86-64 CPUs. They are used by other distributed computing projects as well, such as Seventeen or Bust and PrimeGrid (PRST). GMP-ECM, a sophisticated software package for Lenstra elliptic-curve factorization, can also use gwnum for a more than 8× speedup in stage 1.

He also worked on a TTL version of Maze War while a student at MIT. Later he worked as a programmer for Data General.

== See also ==
- Prime95
