= Great Internet Mersenne Prime Search =

Volunteer project using software to search for Mersenne prime numbers

Great Internet Mersenne Prime Search (GIMPS)
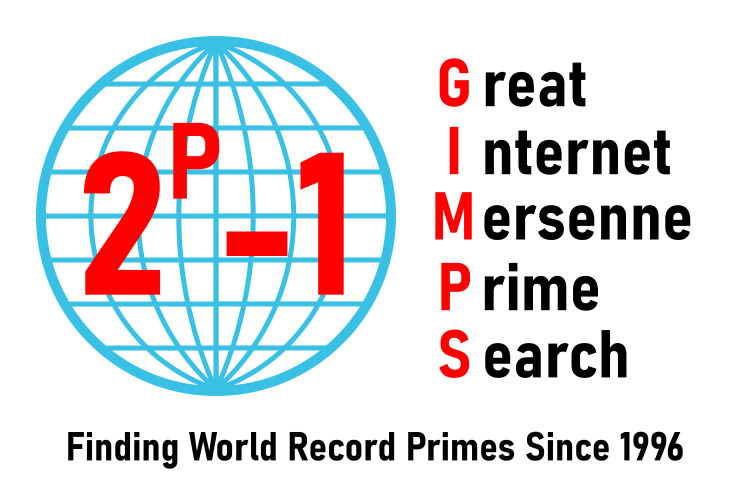
- Logo
- Software used: prime95 (CPU), GpuOwl/PRPLL, Mlucas, mfaktc/mfakto, CUDALucas (GPU), PrMers
- Total users: 290,000
- Total hosts: 3,200,000
- Website: mersenne.org

The Great Internet Mersenne Prime Search (GIMPS) is a collaborative project of volunteers who use freely available software to search for Mersenne prime numbers.

GIMPS was founded in 1996 by George Woltman, who also wrote the Prime95 client and its Linux port MPrime. Scott Kurowski wrote the back-end PrimeNet server to demonstrate volunteer computing software by Entropia, a company he founded in 1997. GIMPS is registered as Mersenne Research, Inc. with Kurowski as Executive Vice President and board director. GIMPS is said to be one of the first large-scale volunteer computing projects over the Internet for research purposes.

As of October 2024, the project has found 18 Mersenne primes, 16 of which were the largest known prime number when they were discovered. The largest known prime is 2^{136,279,841} − 1 (or M_{136,279,841} for short) and was discovered on October 12, 2024, by Luke Durant. On June 18, 2025, the project passed a milestone after all exponents below 136,279,841 were checked at least once.

== Algorithm ==
From its inception until 2018, the project relied primarily on the Lucas–Lehmer primality test (LL), an algorithm that is both specialized for testing Mersenne primes and particularly efficient on binary computer architectures. Before applying it to a given Mersenne number, there was a trial division phase, used to rapidly eliminate many Mersenne numbers with small factors. Pollard's p − 1 algorithm is also used to search for smooth factors. The variant of LL used in the main implementation (Prime95) is specifically based on irrational base discrete weighted transform with double-precision floating-point numbers, which provide an efficient way to square a large number modulo 2^{P} − 1.

Special care is taken to ensure that the use of floating-point numbers does not introduce errors into the LL calculation. The program verifies that the round-off error is no greater than 0.4 every 128 iterations, or if the exponent being tested is within 0.5% of the maximum exponent size that can be handled by the size of FFT in use (or if requested using a special option), at every single iteration. Every 12 hours the program runs an additional error check based on the Jacobi symbol, with a 50% chance of catching an error. On top of these, each completed LL calculation is repeated by a different hardware for "double-checking". Based on historical double-check data, each LL calculation without any serious error reported had an error rate of 1.5%; those with at least one serious error reported had an error rate of 50%.

In 2018, GIMPS adopted a Fermat primality test with basis a = 3 (Note: a=2 would not work as all Mersenne numbers are 2-pseudoprimes.) as an alternative option for primality testing, while keeping the LL test as a double-check for Mersenne numbers detected as probable primes by the Fermat test. This new test is called PRP (probable prime) in GIMPS parlance. Using a method devised by Robert Gerbicz, GIMPS can be "99.999+%" sure that a PRP result is generated correctly. As a result, even though the LL test is deterministic and the Fermat test only probabilistic, (Note: It is neither proven or disproved that Mersenne 3-pseudoprimes exist.) the probability of the Fermat test finding a Fermat pseudoprime that is not prime is vastly lower than the error rate of the LL test due to computer hardware errors.

In September 2020, GIMPS began to support primality proofs based on verifiable delay functions countributed by Krzysztof Pietrzak. The proof files are generated while the Fermat primality test is in progress. These proofs, together with Gerbicz's error-checking algorithm, provide complete confidence in the correctness of the test result and eliminate the need for double checks (check of proof could be run in 1/100 of the time of the original Fermat computation). First-time LL tests were deprecated in April 2021, leaving LL to be used only on probable primes found by the Fermat test. PRP and LL have similar runtimes; the preference comes from higher confidence in PRP results.

GIMPS also has sub-projects to factor known composite Mersenne and Fermat numbers. These use the elliptic-curve factorization method and Williams's p + 1 algorithm. (Note: For a rationale behind this search, consult the related Cunningham Project.)

== History ==
The project began in January 1996 with a program that ran on i386 computers. The project's name was coined by Luke Welsh, one of its early searchers and the co-discoverer of the 29th Mersenne prime. Several dozen people joined within a few months and over 1,000 by the end of the first year. Joel Armengaud, a participant, discovered the primality of M_{1,398,269} on November 13, 1996. Since then, GIMPS has discovered a new Mersenne prime every 1 to 2 years on average, but the most recent largest prime, found in October 2024, took nearly six years to find.

== Status ==
As of July 2022, GIMPS has a sustained average aggregate throughput of approximately 4.71 PetaFLOPS (or PFLOPS). In November 2012, GIMPS maintained 95 TFLOPS, theoretically earning the GIMPS virtual computer a rank of 330 among the world's TOP500 most powerful computer systems. The preceding place was then held by an 'HP Cluster Platform 3000 BL460c G7' of Hewlett-Packard. As of July 2021 TOP500 results, the current GIMPS numbers would no longer make the list.

This was about 50 TFLOPS in early 2010, 30 TFLOPS in mid-2008, 20 TFLOPS in mid-2006, and 14 TFLOPS in early 2004.

== Software ==
=== Prime95 ===
The primary software GIMPS uses is Prime95, which implements all algorithms for an x86 or x86-64 CPU: trial factoring (usually left to GPUs), PRP, P-1, P+1, ECM, and PRP certification. Although the Prime95 software's source code is publicly available, technically it is not free software, since it requires that users abide by the project's distribution terms. Specifically, if the software is used to discover a prime number with at least 100,000,000 decimal digits, the user will win only $50,000 of the $150,000 prize offered by the Electronic Frontier Foundation. On the other hand, they will win $3,000 when discovering a smaller prime not qualifying for the prize.

GIMPS also "reserves the right to change this EULA without notice and with reasonable retroactive effect."

=== Third-party software ===
Third-party software does not share the same restriction as Prime95. It can be used to join GIMPS using a program called AutoPrimeNet, which fetches tasks from GIMPS and sends back the results. Available software includes:

- Mlucas, which implements LL, Fermat PRP, and Pépin's test. Shipped with MFactor for trial-factoring. Able to run on x86, x86-64, ARM, and most other CPU architectures. Uses double-precision IBDWT.
- Glucas, outdated implementation of LL for x86 and non-x86 CPUs. Uses double-precision IBDWT.
- GPUowl and PRPLL, OpenCL programs for running PRP and LL intended for GPUs. Uses double-precision IBDWT. George Woltman maintains a fork that uses IBDWT in double-precision, single-precision, NTT over GF((2^{31} − 1)^{2}), NTT over GF((2^{61} − 1)^{2}), or a combination thereof.
- mfaktc (CUDA) / mfakto (OpenCL), programs for GPU trial factoring using 32-bit integer arithmetic.
- CUDALucas, outdated implementation of LL for CUDA. Uses double-precision IBDWT.
- PrMers/Marin, implements LL and PRP. Uses IBDWT with number-theoretic transform over Z / (2^{64} − 2^{32} + 1) Z using 64-bit integer arithmetic.

In addition, PrimeNet accepts other forms of data contributions from projects such as TJOAI (Tadashi Taura's custom software to trial-factor many Mersenne numbers at once).

== Primes found ==
All Mersenne primes are of the form M_{p} = 2^{p} − 1, where p is a prime number. The smallest Mersenne prime in this table is 2^{1398269} − 1.

The first column is the rank of the Mersenne prime in the (ordered) sequence of all Mersenne primes; GIMPS has found all known Mersenne primes beginning with the 35th.

#	Discovery date	Prime M_{p}	Digits count	Processor	Method
35	Nov 13, 1996	M_{1 398 269}	420,921	Pentium (90 MHz)	Prime95 LL
36	Aug 24, 1997	M_{2 976 221}	895,932	Pentium (100 MHz)	Prime95 LL
37	Jan 27, 1998	M_{3 021 377}	909,526	Pentium (200 MHz)	Prime95 LL
38	Jun 1, 1999	M_{6 972 593}	2,098,960	Pentium (350 MHz)	Prime95 LL
39	Nov 14, 2001	M_{13 466 917}	4,053,946	AMD T-Bird (800 MHz)	Prime95 LL
40	Nov 17, 2003	M_{20 996 011}	6,320,430	Pentium (2 GHz)	Prime95 LL
41	May 15, 2004	M_{24 036 583}	7,235,733	Pentium 4 (2.4 GHz)	Prime95 LL
42	Feb 18, 2005	M_{25 964 951}	7,816,230	Pentium 4 (2.4 GHz)	Prime95 LL
43	Dec 15, 2005	M_{30 402 457}	9,152,052	Pentium 4 (2 GHz overclocked to 3 GHz)	Prime95 LL
44	Sep 4, 2006	M_{32 582 657}	9,808,358	Pentium 4 (3 GHz)	Prime95 LL
45	Sep 6, 2008	M_{37 156 667}	11,185,272	Intel Core 2 Duo (2.83 GHz)	Prime95 LL
46	Jun 4, 2009	M_{42 643 801}	12,837,064	Intel Core 2 Duo (3 GHz)	Prime95 LL
47	Aug 23, 2008	M_{43 112 609}	12,978,189	Intel Core 2 Duo E6600 CPU (2.4 GHz)	Prime95 LL
48	Jan 25, 2013	M_{57 885 161}	17,425,170	Intel Core 2 Duo E8400 @ 3.00 GHz	Prime95 LL
49	Jan 7, 2016	M_{74 207 281}	22,338,618	Intel Core i7-4790	Prime95 LL
50	Dec 26, 2017	M_{77 232 917}	23,249,425	Intel Core i5-6600	Prime95 LL
51	Dec 7, 2018	M_{82 589 933}	24,862,048	Intel Core i5-4590T	Prime95 LL
52^{[†]}	Oct 21, 2024	M_{136 279 841}^{[‡]}	41,024,320	Nvidia A100	Gpuowl PRP (verified using LL on Prime95, PRPLL, CUDALucas, etc.)

^{^ †} As of November 16, 2026, 84,106,643 is the largest exponent below which all other prime exponents have been checked twice, so it is not verified whether any undiscovered Mersenne primes exist between the 51st (M_{82589933}) and the 52nd (M_{136279841}) on this chart; the ranking is therefore provisional. Furthermore, 142,869,329 is the largest exponent below which all other prime exponents have been tested at least once, so all Mersenne numbers below the 52nd Mersenne prime have been tested.

^{^ ‡} The number M_{136279841} has 41,024,320 decimal digits. To help visualize the size of this number, if it were to be saved to disk, the resulting text file would be nearly 42 megabytes long (most books in plain text format are under two megabytes). A standard word processor layout (50 lines per page, 75 digits per line) would require 10,940 pages to display it. If one were to print it out using standard printer paper, single-sided, it would require approximately 22 reams (22 × 500 = 11,000 sheets) of paper.

As mentioned above, every Lucas-Lehmer result undergoes double-checking to avoid both false positives and false negatives. Positive results are given more scrutiny. The importance of this was illustrated in 2003, when a false positive was reported to the server as being a Mersenne prime but verification failed.

The official "discovery date" of a prime is the date that a human first noticed the result for the prime, which may differ from the date that the result was first reported to the server. For example, M_{74207281} was reported to the server on September 17, 2015, but the report was overlooked until January 7, 2016.

== See also ==
- Berkeley Open Infrastructure for Network Computing
- List of volunteer computing projects
- PrimeGrid
