= Data General/One =

1981 laptop computer

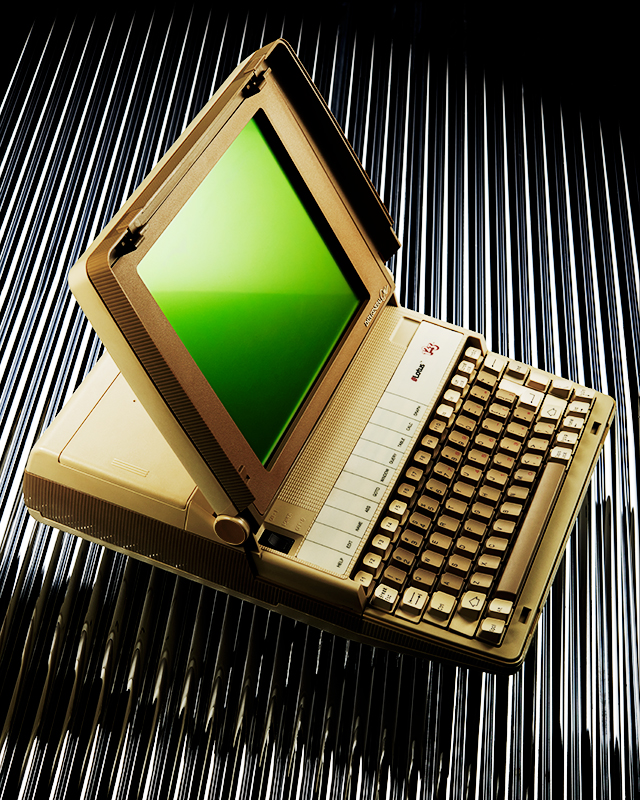
- Manufacturer: Data General
- Type: Laptop
- Released: September 20, 1984; 42 years ago
- Introductory price: US$2,895 (equivalent to $8,970 in 2025)
- Operating system: MS-DOS
- CPU: CMOS 8086 @ 4.0 MHz
- Memory: 128 KB RAM (expandable to 512 KB)
- Storage: 2 × 3.5" diskettes
- Display: Monochrome LCD 80×25 characters
- Graphics: Or full CGA graphics (640×200)
- Input: 79-key full-stroke keyboard
- Weight: 9 lb (4.1 kg)
- Successor: Data General model 2

The Data General/One (DG-1) was a laptop introduced in September 1984 by Data General. It was the first battery-powered laptop on the market that was fully compatible with the IBM PC, featuring a full-sized LCD capable of displaying 80×25 text or CGA graphics (640×200). Although it sold only modestly, the DG-1 set the template for all PC-based laptops to follow. According to eWeek in 2010, it was "the prototype for all that followed ... with its LCD, flat keyboard and clam-shell case, this form factor has remained essentially the same for [decades]".

== Description ==
The nine-pound battery-powered 1984 Data General/One ran MS-DOS and had dual 3.5" diskettes, a 79-key full-stroke keyboard, 128 KB to 512 KB of RAM, and a monochrome LCD screen capable of either the standard 80×25 characters or full CGA graphics (640×200). It was a laptop comparable in capabilities to desktops of the era.

== History ==
The Data General/One offered several features in comparison with contemporary portable computers. For instance, the popular 1983 Radio Shack TRS-80 Model 100, a non-PC-compatible machine, was comparably sized. It was a small battery-operated computer resting in one's lap, but had a 40×8 character (240×64 pixel) screen, a rudimentary ROM-based menu in lieu of a full OS, and no built-in floppy. IBM's 1984 Portable PC was comparable in capability with desktops, but was not battery operable and, being much larger and heavier, was by no means a laptop.

== Drawbacks ==
The DG-1 was only a modest success. One problem was its use of 3.5" diskettes. Popular software titles were thus not widely available (5.25" being still the standard), a serious issue since then-common diskette copy-protection schemes made it difficult for users to copy software into that format. The device achieved moderate success in a large OEM deal with Allen-Bradley, where it was private labelled as a T-45 "programming terminal" and was resold from 1987 to 1991 with thousands of units sold.

The CPU was a CMOS version of the 8086, compatible with the IBM PC's 8088 except it ran slightly slower, at 4.0 MHz instead of the standard 4.77 MHz.

Unlike the Portable PC, the DG-1 laptop could not take regular PC/XT expansion cards.

RS-232 serial ports were built-in, but the CMOS (low battery consumption) serial I-O chip available at design time, a CMOS version of the Intel 8251, was register incompatible with the 8250 serial IC standard for the IBM PC. As a result, software written for the PC serial ports would not run correctly. This required the use of software written using the relatively slower and less flexible BIOS interrupt call (014h), or software written exclusively for the DG-1.

Video memory came out of that available for the operating system; for example, if 256 KB of RAM was installed, only 204 KB might be available to the operating system and user's programs.

Although Creative Computing termed the price of US$2895 "competitive," it was a very expensive system, and usually-needed additions such as more RAM and an external 5 1/4" drive drove the price higher yet. The styling of the product, including a bag designed by Pierre Cardin, implied a more up-market buyer than many typical PC buyers of the time.

The Data General/One also had a built-in dumb terminal emulator, suggesting an attempt to attract as customers those in organisations with large, expensive minicomputers or mainframes that would access corporate data via terminals such as the ADM-3A or Data General's own Dasher terminals (the cost of the laptop would not have seemed excessive in such situations).

The screen was this computer's other great flaw. Although unusually large, the LCD had very low contrast and narrow viewing angle. InfoWorld stated that "the godawful screen made a better mirror than display", and PC Magazine reported that "The exchange 'Why don't you turn it on?' / 'It is on' is no joke. It happened in our offices."

An updated version of the DG-1 appeared later with a much improved electroluminescent screen. However, the light-producing display could be washed out by bright sunlight. Additionally, the new screen was power hungry and consumed so much power that the battery option was removed, thereby causing the DG-1 to lose its status as a true portable.
