= Northgate Computer Systems =

- Type: Incorporated
- Industry: Computer Hardware
- Founded: 1987; 39 years ago
- Founder: Arthur "Art" Lazere
- Defunct: April 25, 2005
- Fate: Dissolved
- Headquarters: Eden Prairie, Minnesota, United States

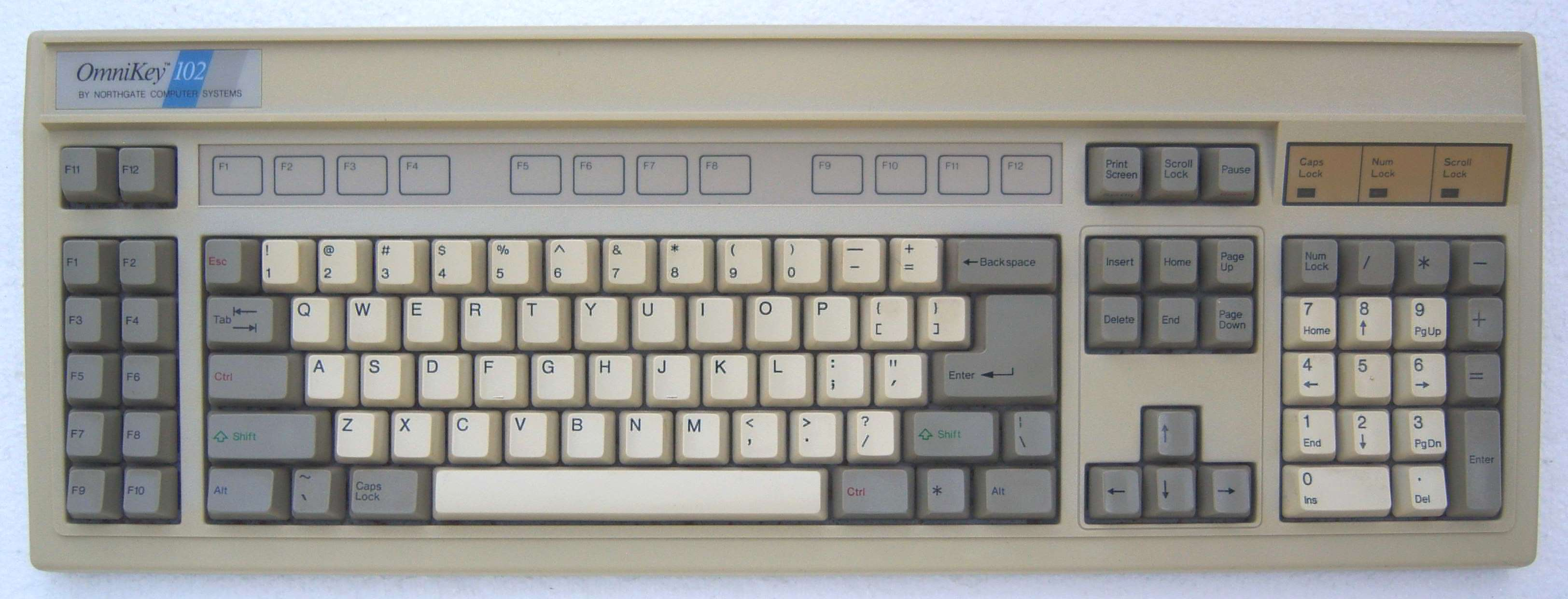
A c. 1989 model Northgate OmniKey/102

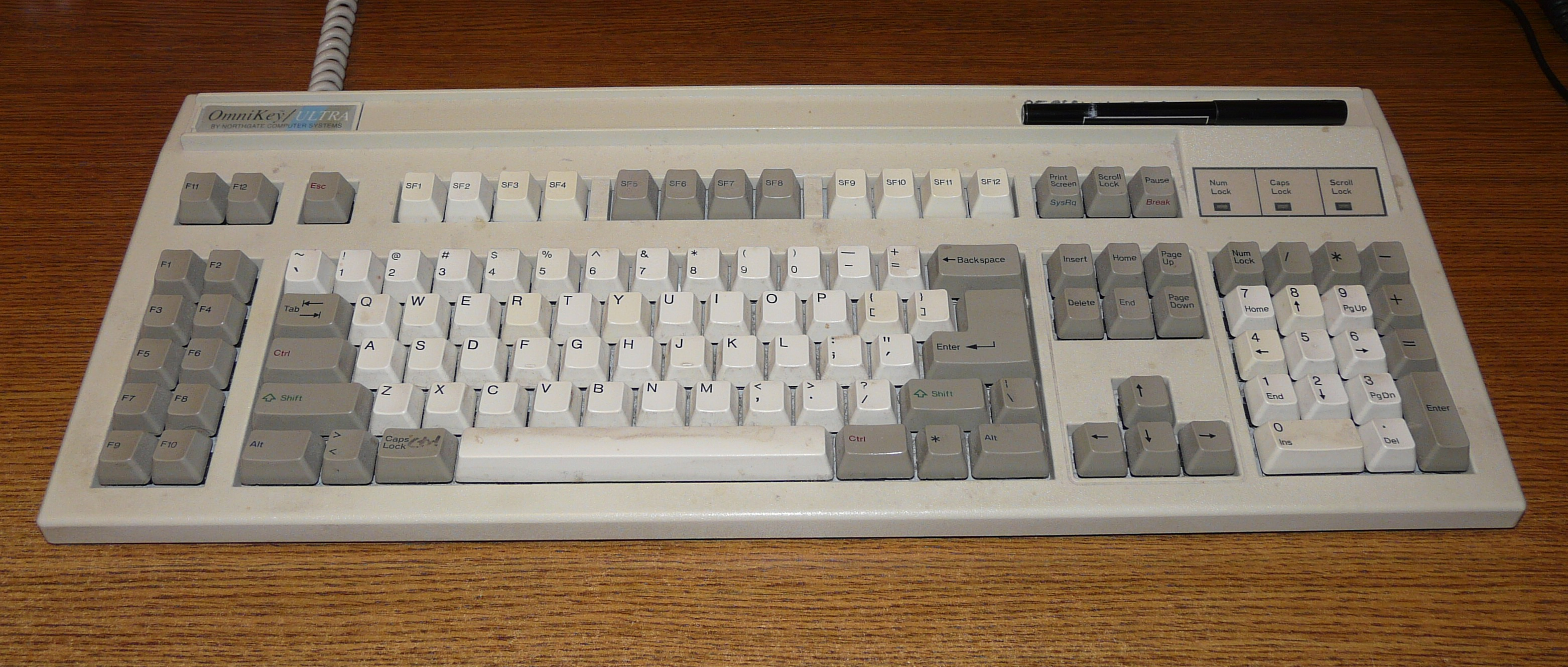
A c. 1993 model Northgate OmniKey/ULTRA-T

Northgate Computer Systems, Inc., based in Eden Prairie, Minnesota, United States, was a mail-order personal computer company founded in 1987 by Arthur "Art" Lazere.

During the 1990s, the mail-order PC market expanded significantly as consumers sought lower-priced alternatives to established retail brands like IBM and Compaq. By selling directly through catalogs, companies like Northgate, Zeos, Dell, and Gateway utilized a direct-to-consumer business model that bypassed traditional retail showrooms.

Northgate manufactured both computer systems and peripherals. The company's OmniKey line of keyboards received positive reception in contemporary tech publications for their tactile feedback and build quality. They were frequently compared by reviewers to IBM's Model M PC keyboards and were often purchased separately by users of competing PC brands.

== History ==
- 1987 - founded by Arthur Lazere
- 1989 - 386 systems available.
- 1990 - Announced 486 systems using IBM's Micro Channel architecture and merger talks with CPT.
- 1992 - Discussed a merger with Everex Systems but these talks ended and a 51% stake was bought by investor group Marjac Investments.
- August 1994 - A chapter 7 petition was filed against the company by creditors.
- September 1994 - The company filed for a conversion to a chapter 11 reorganization plan. Mylex was owed $4.6 million, $113,000 was expected to be paid from liquidation from Northgate's inventories. The landlord of their Eden Prairie building also canceled their lease and they were planning to move to Minneapolis.
- December 22, 1995 - Announced a reorganization plan with its creditors which paid 19 cents on the dollar to cover $16 million in unsecured debts. The funding would be from a percentage of computer sales up to a maximum of $3.75 million.
- 1997 - Northgate was purchased by Lan Plus.
- October 2000 - Lan Plus begins merger with Mcglen Internet Group.
- April 16, 2001 - Mcglen and Lan Plus announces that the merged company will be operating under the Northgate name.
- September 10, 2001 - Lan Plus and Mcglen expect to complete the merger by October under the name Northgate Innovations with Andy Teng as chairman and CEO. However the completion of the merger wasn't announced until March.
- September 20, 2002 - Announced a "Volunteer Training Program" with local technical schools to provide real-world computer manufacturing experience. Their principal executive offices are now in City of Industry, California.
- 2003 - Announced a trial with 7-Eleven to sell Northgate Computer branded PCs through their stores.
- 2004 - Name changed to Digital Lifestyles Group to focus on the "teen computing and digital lifestyle" market with a new "hip-e" brand.
- 2005 - On April 25 an announcement on their web site stated "Northgate Computers will close its operations to all customers. Northgate will no longer supply any type of warranty services inclusive of technical phone support."

After Northgate went out of business, Creative Vision Technologies picked up the line of keyboards, marketing them under the Avant brand. However, CVT was acquired by Ideal System Solutions in 2011 and the product is no longer listed.
