= List of The Woodwright's Shop episodes =

This is a list of episodes for the PBS television series The Woodwright's Shop starring Roy Underhill. The typical season is 13 episodes and starts towards the end of September or early October. The series was first broadcast only on North Carolina's PBS channel. After two years, the series was broadcast nationally.

== Season 1 (1980) ==
This was the first season to use the original The Woodwright's Shop opening and closing theme composed by The Red Clay Ramblers, and it remained in use until Season 8 in 1988.

No. overall	No. in season	Title	Original release date
1	101	"Maul and Glut (series premiere)"	6 October 1979 (local); 3 October 1980 (national)
In the series premiere, host Roy Underhill introduces viewers to "The Woodwright's Shop" and explains the show's purpose, including making items such as rocking chairs, bowls, spoons, and bowl shavings, while also utilizing solar energy captured in the gardens for woodworking. Underhill gives viewers a tour of the tools and techniques used, including making baskets and entire buildings. He demonstrates using a treadle lathe, setting up a lathe, working with iron, using a blacksmith's drill press, and joining wood to understand its properties for creating items like garden rakes, green shovels, pitchforks, broad axes, boring machines, and corner chisels. He also covers timber frame construction, bench work, using planes for tongueing and grooving, dovetails for joining boxes, and panel frame construction for making tools. After touring the shop, Underhill goes outside, fells a tree, and demonstrates making two traditional tools, a maul and a glut, using traditional iron woodworking tools.
2	102	"Shaving Horse"	13 October 1979 (local); 10 October 1980 (national)
Roy starts construction of one of the most important hand-tool shop items – a shaving horse – to make working with draw knives and spoke shaves easier.
3	103	"Dumbheads in Action"	20 October 1979 (local); 17 October 1980 (national)
One of the most important pieces of equipment in a complete hand tool woodworking shop is a shaving horse. In this second of two segments, join Roy Underhill as he finishes construction of his shaving horse and demonstrates how to use a spokeshave or draw knife to work wood accurately and effectively.
4	104	"Hay Rake"	27 October 1979 (local); 24 October 1980 (national)
Roy makes one of his favorite projects – a hickory hay rake that is both lightweight and very strong.
5	105	"Lathes"	3 November 1979 (local); 31 October 1980 (national)
Roy takes us on a tour of the history and development of man-powered tools leading to the lathe.
6	106	"Rocking Chair"	10 November 1979 (local); 7 November 1980 (national)
Roy builds a classic armless rocking chair using traditional tools and techniques.
7	107	"Basket Weaving"	17 November 1979 (local); 14 November 1980 (national)
Roy shows us how to create a woven white oak seat for his rocker, and guest Bryant Holsenbeck shows how to weave a traditional basket.
8	108	"Log Cabin"	24 November 1979 (local); 21 November 1980 (national)
Many woodworkers have thought about how to build a log cabin. In this long-awaited episode, Roy demonstrates early-colonial construction, dimensions logs and join corners – all skills you’ll need if you want to build a log home properly. Roy points out how many early home builders in North America created log homes with very tight joints designed to keep out the wind and elements. If you want to build a log home properly, learn it from Roy.
9	109	"Timber Frame Construction"	1 December 1979 (local); 28 November 1980 (national)
Classic timber frame construction and post-and-beam construction are hallmarks of early colonial buildings in North America. Watch as Roy shares the details of timber frame construction, using post-and-beam and mortise-and-tenon techniques. You’ll learn new skills using a boring machine, corner chisel and more.
10	110	"Dough Bowls and Pitch Forks"	8 December 1979 (local); 5 December 1980 (national)
Roy creates both a pitchfork and a dough bowl, each made from a single piece of wood.
11	111	"Blacksmithing"	15 December 1979 (local); 12 December 1980 (national)
Roy switched to working at the forge to show some basic blacksmithing techniques and shows how to create a spike dog used in timber framing.
12	112	"Panel Frame and Dovetail"	22 December 1979 (local); 19 December 1980 (national)
Roy discusses frame-and-panel construction for doors and the basic steps to create a dovetailed joint.
13	113	"Colonial Williamsburg (season finale)"	29 December 1979 (local); 26 December 1980 (national)
In the season finale, we join Roy on a visit to Colonial Williamsburg to take a look at 18th Century craftsmanship, including a visit with a wheelwright, cooper, blacksmith and the Anthony Hay Cabinet Shop.

== Season 2 (1982) ==
No. overall	No. in season	Title	Original release date
14	201	"Getting a Grip on It (season premiere)"	2 October 1982
In the Season 2 premiere, Roy looks closely at a number of tool handles, then creates an axe handle from a split of hickory and turns a chisel handle.
15	202	"Candle Stand"	9 October 1982
Roy walks us through the necessary steps to create a classic walnut candle stand.
16	203	"Plane Truth, Version 1"	16 October 1982
Roy gives us the history of a wide selection of classic hand planes, and explains the wide variety of specialized uses.
17	204	"Plane Truth, Version 2"	23 October 1982
Roy gives us the history of a wide selection of classic hand planes, and explains the wide variety of specialized uses. Lost episode.
18	205	"In Yer Drawers"	30 October 1982
We join Roy as he makes a hand-hewed, half-blind dovetailed drawer for his work bench, discussing many of the techniques used in drawer-making.
19	206	"Findin' and Fixin'"	6 November 1982
Roy stops off at a scrap yard, antique store and a flea market to show us the treasures to be found.
20	207	"Cutting Your Teeth"	13 November 1982
This episode is all about saws. Roy shows us a dizzying array of saws, from very familiar panel saws tobow saws and pit saws. He rounds out the show by showing how to sharpen the blade of a bow saw.
21	208	"While the Iron's Hot"	20 November 1982
Roy travels to Colonial Williamsburg to work with the blacksmiths to weld and create a froe and forge a cant hook.
22	209	"Straight and Narrow"	27 November 1982
Lost episode.
23	210	"Vernacular Sash"	4 December 1982
Roy takes us through the hand-crafted creation process of a sash-style window, explaining the stiles, rails and muntins.
24	211	"Woodwright at Sea"	11 December 1982
The evolution of modern boat building in America starts with simple designs such as those found in rough-hewn canoes – and its surprisingly fundamental. Watch Roy explore how to build a boat as he visits the Hampton Mariner’s Museum and discusses boat building that’s large and complex. There is a clear evolution in tools and techniques and it’s both instructive and entertaining to watch this process.
25	212	"A Tale of Two Toys"	18 December 1982
Roy looks at a collection of classic wood toys, and then shows us the steps to create a Crow Chaser.
26	213	"Williamsburg Housewright (season finale)"	25 December 1982
Lost episode.

== Season 3 (1983) ==
No. overall	No. in season	Title	Original release date
27	301	"Inner Woodworking (season premiere)"	1 October 1983
As "The Woodwright's Shop" begins its third season on PBS, Roy explores how wood grows, how it's worked with the shop's tools, and previews projects and topics for the season.
28	302	"Workbench Part I"	8 October 1983
Roy hand-crafts the frame for a massive, classic workbench using pegged and keyed mortise-and-tenon construction.
29	303	"Worbench Part II"	15 October 1983
Roy finishes the workbench started in the previous episode.
30	304	"Coopers Bucket"	22 October 1983
With some help a couple of coopers from Colonial Williamsburg, Roy shows the steps to creating a cooper’s bucket.
31	305	"Blanket Chest"	29 October 1983
Roy builds a classic, nailed-together, six-board blanket chest with an interior till.
32	306	"Simple Gifts"	5 November 1983
Roy shows us how to build three simple gift projects including a flapping duck toy, a small pine knock-down bench and a wooden egg beater.
33	307	"Whimsy Diddling"	12 November 1983
Roy shows how to make the quintessential mountain folk toy, the Gee Haw Whimmey Diddle and also a Willow Whistle. He also shows some museum pieces of carved whimsy.
34	308	"Furniture Carving"	19 November 1983
Roy welcomes Wallace Gusler from Colonial Williamsburg to take a close look at the techniques and tools required for carved furniture in the 18th-Century style.
35	309	"Whetstone Quarry"	26 November 1983
Roy takes us through the geological history of whetstones for sharpening tools. He takes us on a trip to find the rough stone and how to create your own stones (as well as some sharpening tips).
36	310	"The Gunsmith"	3 December 1983
Roy visits with gunsmith Gary Brumfield of Colonial Williamsburg and gives us a fascinating look at the hand-crafted steps necessary to create an 18th-Century rifle – lock, stock and barrel.
37	311	"Wood for the Weaver"	10 December 1983
This episode focuses on wooden accessories used by traditional weavers in the 18th-Century including spinning wheels, clock reels, niddy noddys and Roy makes a swift and a tape loom.
38	312	"The Luthier"	17 December 1983
George Wilson from at Colonial Williamsburg shows Roy what it took to create an 18th-Century violin, from wood to fittings.
39	313	"The Basketmakers (season finale)"	24 December 1983
As The Woodwright's Shop concludes its 3rd season on PBS, Roy Black and Robert Watson from Colonial Williamsburg demonstrate how to make round-bottom and flat-bottom white oak baskets, crafting them from a log using only traditional tools.

== Season 4 (1984) ==
No. overall	No. in season	Title	Original release date
40	401	"The Dominy Shop (season premiere)"	6 October 1984
The Woodwright's Shop begins its fourth season with host Roy Underhill touring the Dominy Shop at the Winterthur Museum. The shop contains tools and items used by three generations of craftsmen from 1750 to 1850.
41	402	"A Springpole Lathe"	13 October 1984
Roy walks us through the steps to create a simple, but accurate and functional spring pole lathe.
42	403	"Ball & Claw Feet"	20 October 1984
Roy welcomes Wallace Gusler from Colonial Williamsburg, and he shows the process to create a cabriole leg with a ball and claw foot.
43	404	"The Wainscot Chair"	27 October 1984
Roy works with his daughter, Rachel, to create a child-size, 17th-century chair found in a book by Wallace Nutting.
44	405	"Tool Boxes & Chests"	3 November 1984
Roy explores the contents of a recently purchased tool chest, trying to determine something of the original owner. He then shows how to recreate the chest itself.
45	406	"Chip Carving"	10 November 1984
Mack Headley from Colonial Williamsburg visits the shop and demonstrates the chip carving techniques used to decorate furniture.
46	407	"Good Fences"	17 November 1984
Roy looks at the details of early-American fences, including lightweight and portable fences used for sheep herding, garden fences and more substantial post and rail "fences" used in forts built around 1620.
47	408	"Kitchen Gifts"	24 November 1984
When Roy and his wife, Jane, were a young married couple, they often didn't have enough money to buy gifts for special occasions, so naturally they made them. Roy shows you how to make some always-appropriate and useful utensils for the kitchen including a rolling pin, heavy spoon, a collapsible drinking cup and more.
48	409	"Raising the Shop"	1 December 1984
Roy pitches in with the raising of the frame-and-timber structure for Anderson’s Forge at Colonial Williamsburg.
49	410	"Building a Boat"	8 December 1984
Roy builds a small rowboat using traditional tools and techniques.
50	411	"Rittenhouse Hygrometer"	15 December 1984
After discussing how humidity affects different wood species, Roy makes a clever and simple late 18th-century hygrometer to measure the humidity in the shop.
51	412	"Corner Cupboard"	22 December 1984
Roy recreates a classic pine corner cupboard.
52	413	"High Chair (season finale)"	29 December 1984
As The Woodwright's Shop concludes its 4th season on PBS, Roy constructs an 18th-century baby's high chair featuring rush seating.

== Season 5 (1985) ==
No. overall	No. in season	Title	Original release date
52	501	"Rustic Rockers (season premiere)"	5 October 1985
The show begins its 5th season with host Roy Underhill, who presents a history of rustic furniture and guides viewers through the steps of making a Rustic Rocker.
54	502	"Bark Bottoms"	12 October 1985
To finish up the Rustic Rocker, Roy takes us into the woods to gather hickory bark, and then heads into the shop to create the woven bark seat for the rocker.
55	503	"Baby Cradle"	19 October 1985
Roy takes us into the shop to finish up a pilgrim-style oak cradle that he started, but never finished, reviewing the "tricky" parts necessary to create the whole project.
56	504	"Chris' Workshop"	26 October 1985
We visit with a 14-year-old traditional woodworker who sells his wares (walking sticks, toys and more), to make more money to buy tools he can’t make for himself.
57	505	"Iron Machine, Foot Power"	2 November 1985
A collector of cast-iron, foot-powered woodworking lathes and fret saws visits with Roy and they try out a number of the machines.
58	506	"Hutch Table I"	9 November 1985
In part one, Roy starts the base of a classic early-American project that serves as a tilt-top table, chair and storage unit.
59	507	"Hutch Table II"	16 November 1985
In part two, Roy finishes the base and completes the top of the early-American tilt-top table. He also shows how to make a traditional milk paint finish for the piece.
60	508	"Iron Bloomery"	23 November 1985
Roy visits with David Harvey, a blacksmith at Colonial Williamsburg, and learns how to turn bog ore into a woodworking chisel.
61	509	"Berry Buckets, Sussex Trugs and Bark Sheaths"	30 November 1985
Roy shows how to create three projects that are created directly from trees and bark, with very little refinement.
62	510	"Wheelwright"	7 December 1985
We head back to Colonial Williamsburg where Roy visits with master wheelwright Dan Stebbins to discover the mysteries and realities of making wheels for early American wagons and carts.
63	511	"Music Mill"	14 December 1985
Roy makes a six-note music mill from wine bottles that is powered by hand crank – but that can also be powered by a water wheel.
64	512	"Secrets From the Cabinet Shop"	21 December 1985
Roy travels back to visit with master cabinetmaker Mack Headley at the Anthony Hay shop at Colonial Williamsburg. He shares some of the secrets that were standard fare for 18th-century American woodworking.
65	513	"A Glass Act (season finale)"	28 December 1985
As The Woodwright's Shop winds down its 5th season, Roy takes through the many steps and details that must align to make a good window.

== PBS Season 6 (1986) ==
The 100th episode of The Woodwright's Shop airs.

No. overall	No. in season	Title	Original release date
92	601	"Turning of the Screw (season premiere)"	TBA
The Woodwright's Shop begins its sixth season on PBS, with host Roy Underhill exploring the making of wooden screws for the workshop.
93	602	"That Old Spoon Carver"	TBA
Roy visits with expert spoon carver Roger Sandstrom to talk technique, wood selection and more about carving spoons and treenware.
94	603	"Don't Crush That Bookstand, Hand Me the Pliers"	TBA
Roy tackles creating a classic Wooden Pliers whittled from a single piece of wood, and then expands the concept to a folding bookstand using similar joinery.
95	604	"Folding Lathe"	TBA
Roy shows how to build an 18th-century French lathe designed to fold up and store in the corner.
96	605	"Jacobean Stool"	TBA
We learn how to create the traditional joinery for a Jacobean stool.
97	606	"Turning and Carving"	TBA
Roy finishes the Jacobean stool by adding the turning and carving to the frame.
98	607	"Things They'd Never Make for Themselves"	TBA
We spend some quality time with Roy making small projects from scrap wood, including wooden ties, a pop gun, ado-nothing machine and a flying top.
99	608	"Anderson's Forge"	TBA
Roy travels to the John Anderson Forge at Colonial Williamsburg to look at how nails, hinges and tools were made in Colonial America.
100	609	"Botetourt Chair"	TBA
Roy takes a look at 18th Century woodworking details found in furniture from the Colonial Williamsburg cabinet shop.
101	610	"Lap Desk"	TBA
Build one of the classic 18th Century projects with Roy: a Shaker lap desk.
102	611	"Rachel's Wagon"	TBA
Roy walks through the steps required to build a wooden wagon for his daughters – but manages to have some fun himself.
103	612	"Toolmaker's Art"	TBA
Roy visits with Peter Ross at the Anderson Forge to look at 18th Century tool making, in particular, a gentleman’s hatchet.
104	613	"House Framing Doggie Style (season finale)"	TBA
Season 6 finale: Roy Underhill and his dog Grit build a framed doghouse.

== PBS Season 7 (1987) ==
No. overall	No. in season	Title	Original release date
105	701	"Noveltails (season premiere)"	TBA
As The Woodwright's Shop begins its seventh season on PBS, host Roy Underhill examines the design and benefits of numerous traditional dovetails, then explores some more unusual examples.
106	702	"Longer and Stronger"	TBA
When you need a longer board (or rafter), then a traditional scarf joint may be the answer. Roy discusses the history, value and creation of this important joint.
107	703	"Country Comfort"	TBA
Roy shows us the steps to create the perfect outdoor chair – the Adirondack.
108	704	"Shaker Boxes"	TBA
After a look at a number foot-powered woodworking machines, Roy and his guest show how to use a few of the machines to make traditional Shaker oval boxes.
109	705	"Bookcaseology"	TBA
This episode is Roy’s version of waste not, want not. He shows how to build a coffin-shaped bookcase so that the materials involved aren’t wasted, but used during life – and after.
110	706	"Woodwork, Needlework"	TBA
Blending two traditional crafts, Roy builds an adjustable needlework stand of French design.
111	707	"Whirligigs"	TBA
Whirligig expert Anders Lunde visits Roy in the shop to talk about the history, design and construction details of a variety of whirligigs.
112	708	"Felling and Hauling"	TBA
Traditional woodworking starts with the trees. Roy shares the traditional steps necessary to fell a tree and get the wood into the shop.
113	709	"Bramble Work"	TBA
Roy gives us a look at rustic Bramble Work furniture. He then creates a small table in this style, working with twigs fastened in geometric patterns.
114	710	"Farmwood"	TBA
Roy works through the varied historical uses of lumber for use in construction, furniture, heating on your own farm, and for sharing with others. No part of the tree is wasted.
115	711	"Old South Homestead"	TBA
On a trip back to the Underhill homestead, Roy takes us on visit of some of the construction details used in building the 1850s house and outbuildings.
116	712	"Gameboards"	TBA
Roy shows us how to make a couple of classic board games: Fox and Geese, and a checkers (or chess) board.
117	713	"Woodcut Printing (season finale)"	TBA
In the Season 7 finale, Roy visits the Bookbinders Shop at Colonial Williamsburg to learn about the history and practice of woodcutting for printing.

== PBS Season 8 (1988) ==
This was the last season to use the original The Woodwright's Shop opening and closing themes, composed by The Red Clay Ramblers, which had been used since Season 1 in 1980.

No. overall	No. in season	Title	Original release date
118	801	"Jefferson's Ladder (season premiere)"	TBA
Opening the 8th season of The Woodwright's Shop, host Roy Underhill demonstrates how to recreate an 18th-century folding library ladder that collapses into a simple pole.
119	802	"Boxwood Recorder"	TBA
Roy shows us how to recreate a boxwood recorder
120	803	"Beginning the Four-Harness Loom"	TBA
During two episodes we learn how to recreate an 18th-century loom for weaving cloth. The first episode focuses on the frame of the loom.
121	804	"Finishing the Four-Harness Loom"	TBA
Roy completes the project of recreating an 18th-century loom for weaving cloth.
122	805	"Rosebud"	TBA
A wonderful tradition, Roy builds a classic Yankee sled and a toboggan for enjoying the next snowfall.
123	806	"Workbenches for Everyone"	TBA
Roy looks at the variety of benches used for woodworking, including a joiner’s bench, hacking benches, and a chair maker’s bench.
124	807	"Folk Toys for Little Folks"	TBA
Roy loves his toys, and this episode is dedicated to making three folk toys: a fish hook; chickens pecking toy; and a Jacob’s ladder.
125	808	"Making the Appalachian Dulcimer"	TBA
A traditional American stringed instrument, Roy shows us the steps to make a classic dulcimer.
126	809	"Folding Folk Chairs"	TBA
Recreated for centuries, Roy shares methods for creating two different classic folding stools.
127	810	"English Woodcraft"	TBA
Roy visits Sussex, England to view classic building construction techniques and joinery.
128	811	"African Legacy"	TBA
Roy looks at a balaphone (or marimba), kalimba (or thumb piano), a banjo and couple of African drums.
129	812	"Turning the Tables at the Tavern"	TBA
Build a classic, small pine tavern table.
130	813	"Tankard From the Mary Rose (season finale)"	TBA
As The Woodwright's Shop concludes its 8th season, Lew LeCompte, a Williamsburg cooper, demonstrates how to make a "tigg," or drinking mug.

== PBS Season 9 (1989) ==
Starting with this season, The Woodwright's Shop introduced a new opening and closing sequence, along with the theme song "Kildare's Fancy", performed by Rod Abernethy, which was used until the show ended in 2017. This replaced the show's original theme music composed by The Red Clay Ramblers, from seasons 1–8 (1980–1988).

No. overall	No. in season	Title	Original release date
131	901	"Making a Butterfly Table (season premiere)"	TBA
The Woodwright's Shop begins its 9th season, as host Roy Underhill builds the frame for an early Colonial two-sided drop-leaf tavern table.
132	902	"Dovetailing Drawers"	TBA
Roy continues the building process for the Butterfly Table by creating the top using a drop-leaf rule joint.
133	903	"Making the Dropleaf Rule Joint"	TBA
In the final part of Making A Butterfly Table, Roy makes the half-blind dovetailed drawer that fits underneath the top.
134	904	"Dancing Toys"	TBA
Roy makes three toys: a Limberjack dancing toy; an acrobat toy and a jointed toy.
135	905	"Make Gypsy Willow Chairs"	TBA
This classic rustic chair is easily made by bending green twigs. Roy shows the steps to make your own.
136	906	"Tinsmithing for Fun and Profit"	TBA
Roy visits with 3rd generation tinsmith, Peter Blum, who shows how to make a candle holder, a heart-in-hand cookie cutter, a pie plate and a tin whistle.
137	907	"Boxes Without Topses"	TBA
Roy makes four boxes: a bamboo birdcage; a carved figure box with hidden valuables compartment; an exploding bank box and a snake box.
138	908	"Order in the Court"	TBA
Roy visits the restoration site of the 18th-Century James City County Courthouse, in particular, the interior casework and millwork.
139	909	"Bricks Without Straw"	TBA
Roy visits Colonial Williamsburg to learn about the all-but-forgotten skill of creating bricks by hand.
140	910	"Log Cabin Building"	TBA
In this first of three shows, Roy explains first steps in building a traditional log cabin. First the trees must be felled, debarked and notched.
141	911	"Log Cabin Building"	TBA
In this episode, Roy creates the doorway for the cabin, frames the roof and lays the roofing boards in place…all without using any nails.
142	912	"Log Cabin Building"	TBA
In the final log cabin episode, Roy shows how to chink and daub the gaps between the logs and adds a stick-and-mud chimney for the cabin. Lastly, he adds the door.
143	913	"Marquetry: Painting With Wood (season finale)"	TBA
In the Season 9 finale, Chris Lang joins Roy in the shop to explore the traditional woodworking technique of marquetry, specifically how to create a shell medallion.

== PBS Season 10 (1990) ==
No. overall	No. in season	Title	Original release date
144	1001	"Make This Rocking Horse! (season premiere)"	TBA
In the Season 10 premiere, Roy's daughter Eleanor Underhill visits the shop to build a traditional rocking horse.
145	1002	"Beat Your Ash Basketry"	TBA
Jonathan Kline visits the shop to create a traditional Black Ash basket, stripping the material from the log.
146	1003	"Make a Revolving Bookcase"	TBA
Build an early 20th-Century revolving bookcase that holds an amazing number of books.
147	1004	"Timber Building in Franconia"	TBA
Roy visits the Franconian Open-air Museum in Bavaria to look at woodworking, timber framing and craftsmanship.
148	1005	"Secrets of German Woodcraft"	TBA
Back at the Franconian Open-air Museum to look at early German building and construction techniques.
149	1006	"Make a Garden Gate"	TBA
Roy builds an open-frame garden gate.
150	1007	"Hooks, Crooks and Walking Sticks"	TBA
One of Roy's passions is walking sticks, here he shows how to make a walking stick with its own built-in flute.
151	1008	"Make a Music Mill From Bali"	TBA
Build a charming, wind-powered, bamboo music mill.
152	1009	"Dovetailing in the Tool Chest"	TBA
Roy revisits an earlier tool chest project to show the value and importance of dovetailing.
153	1010	"As the Wood Turns"	TBA
Roy gives us an overview of turning and of three lathes: a spring-pole lathe, a folding spring-pole lathe and a foot-treadle flywheel lathe.
154	1011	"Boat to Build With the Kids"	TBA
Rachel Underhill joins her dad in the shop to make a canvass and wood kayak.
155	1012	"Rake's Progress"	TBA
Roy repairs one of his 10-year-old rakes, taking the opportunity to highlight the strength of wood when using the grain correctly.
156	1013	"Making Wooden Shoes (season finale)"	TBA
In the 10th season finale, Bob Siegel, Jr. visits Roy in the shop to share his expertise in crafting wooden shoes using only four traditional tools.

== PBS Season 11 (1991) ==
No. overall	No. in season	Title	Original release date
157	1101	"Make a Chair (season premiere)"	TBA
The show begins its 11th season, with host Roy Underhill starting a classic post-and-rung rocking chair using traditional greenwood techniques, beginning with shaping the posts and rungs.
158	1102	"Rollin' on the Rocker"	TBA
Work on the rocker continues, shaping the tenons, boring the mortises and creating the splats to begin construction of the frame.
159	1103	"Splittin' and Sittin'"	TBA
Work on the rocker is completed, with the creation of the rockers and adding a hickory bark seat.
160	1104	"Hewing a Dough Bowl"	TBA
Roy creates a traditional dough bowl from tulip poplar, hollowing out the interior and shaping the exterior.
161	1105	"Wood-Turning Tricks"	TBA
Eleanor Underhill joins Dad in the shop to turn a painted candlestand.
162	1106	"Archer's Bow"	TBA
Roy welcomes a bowyer and a fletcher to the shop to shop how to make a woodland indian’s bow and river cane arrows, talking primitive tools along the way.
163	1107	"Four-Poster Bed"	TBA
This may not be the four-poster bed you’re thinking of, as Roy builds a rustic version from rough red cedar logs.
164	1108	"Blacksmith of Williamsburg"	TBA
Roy visits Colonial Williamsburg to watch the creation of a set of hardware for window shutters.
165	1109	"Williamsburg Woodcraft"	TBA
Continuing the Williamsburg theme, Roy visits the woodworker’s shop to see how frame-and-panel shutters were made in the 18th-Century.
166	1110	"Woodworker's Grab Bag"	TBA
Daughter Rachel joins Roy in the shop to make a marble track toy and Kick-Me machine.
167	1111	"Thomas Jefferson, Woodworker"	TBA
Roy visits Monticello to look at some of the architectural creations and innovations of the former President.
168	1112	"Dovetailed Bookcases"	TBA
Roy recreates stacking "book box" shelves built by John Hemmings for Thomas Jefferson, and still on display at Monticello.
169	1113	"Japanese Woodcrafter (season finale)"	TBA
In the 11th season finale, Toshio Odate visits Roy in the shop to discuss and demonstrate Japanese woodworking tools, techniques, and joinery.

== PBS Season 12 (1992) ==
No. overall	No. in season	Title	Original release date
170	1201	"Bentwood Boxes of the Northwest Coast (season premiere)"	3 October 1992
Opening the 12th season, host Roy Underhill visits Gregg Blomberg to explore Pacific Northwest woodworking.
171	1202	"A Civil War Quilting Frame"	10 October 1992
Roy's wife Jane Underhill visits Roy in the shop to build a traditional quilting frame.
172	1203	"African Chair From the Ivory Coast"	17 October 1992
Roy and his friend Robert Watson make a "man's chair" using tools from the Ivory Coast of Africa.
173	1204	"Hispanic Furniture-Making"	24 October 1992
Roy learns about northern New Mexico woodworking on the Santa Fe Trail.
174	1205	"Colonial Tape Loom"	31 October 1992
Roy begins making a tiny tape loom, used for making decorative fabric.
175	1206	"Dovetailing a Loom Box"	7 November 1992
Roy finishes the tape loom by making a beautiful box for it with dovetails and turned columns.
176	1207	"A Colonial Standing Desk"	14 November 1992
Roy makes a standing desk using mortise-and-tenon and tongue-and-grove joints.
177	1208	"Banding Together"	21 November 1992
Instrument maker Marcus Hanson makes inlay banding with Roy at the Anthony Hay Cabinet Shop.
178	1209	"The Art of Finishing"	28 November 1992
Roy returns to the Anthony Hay Cabinet Shop to learn finishing.
179	1210	"Fifteen Tools From a Dead Man's Chest"	5 December 1992
Roy restores the tools found in an antique chest.
180	1211	"A Pilgrim's Chest of Oak"	12 December 1992
Roy makes a Spanish pilgrim's chest from New Mexico.
181	1212	"Woodcarvers of the Sacred"	19 December 1992
Returning to New Mexico once again, Roy explores religious carving and woodworking in the mountains north of Santa Fe.
182	1213	"Moravian Chair (season finale)"	26 December 1992
In the 12th season finale, Roy makes a Moravian chair reinforced with dovetailed battens, making the small piece extraordinarily strong.

== PBS Season 13 (1993) ==
No. overall	No. in season	Title	Original release date
183	1301	"English Walnut Music Stand (season premiere)"	2 October 1993
As The Woodwright's Shop begins its 13th season on PBS, host Roy Underhill demonstrates how to build a beautiful, adjustable music stand, allowing for optimal height and angle for the musician.
184	1302	"Fair And Square"	9 October 1993
Roy works through the steps to turn a round log into a square timber, and then shows how to bore a square hole.
185	1303	"Fireplace Bellows"	16 October 1993
Making a bellows for a fireplace, with leather-crafter Doug Rowe.
186	1304	"Hickory Pitchfork"	23 October 1993
Through shaving, steaming and bending, Roy creates a pitchfork from a green hickory limb.
187	1305	"Continental Army Canteen"	30 October 1993
Learn to build a wooden canteen using stave construction.
188	1306	"Make A Windsor Chair (Part 1)"	6 November 1993
In this three-episode project Roy builds a variation of a swiveling Windsor chair allegedly used by Thomas Jefferson during the writing of the Declaration of Independence.
189	1307	"Make A Windsor Chair (Part 2)"	13 November 1993
Part two of a variation of a swiveling Windsor chair allegedly used by Thomas Jefferson during the writing of the Declaration of Independence.
190	1308	"Make A Windsor Chair (Part 3)"	20 November 1993
Part three of a variation of a swiveling Windsor chair allegedly used by Thomas Jefferson during the writing of the Declaration of Independence.
191	1309	"The Geddy Foundry of Williamsburg"	27 November 1993
Roy visits the foundry at Williamsburg to view the processes of pouring and finishing brass and silver for hardware and household items.
192	1310	"Crazy Wooden Things for Kids to Make"	4 December 1993
Roy uses the theme of string-powered toys to show us how to make a spinning top, pump drill and a simplified version of the mechanism for a flying ball clock.
193	1311	"Spiral Turning and Xylophone Tones"	11 December 1993
Learn the basics of two simple and fun projects: carving a spiral and building a tongue drum.
194	1312	"Timber Building in the Land of the Midnight Sun"	18 December 1993
Roy visits Lilehammer, Norway looking at traditional Norwegian folk architecture and building techniques.
195	1313	"Norwegian Wood (season finale)"	25 December 1993
In the 13th season finale, Roy travels to Norway, visiting a Viking ship museum and the Norwegian Folk Museum.

== PBS Season 14 (1994) ==
The 200th episode of The Woodwright's Shop airs.

No. overall	No. in season	Title	Original release date
196	1401	"Woodworkers of the Red Dragon (season premiere)"	1 October 1994
The show begins its 14th season with host Roy Underhill visiting a recreated Celtic village in Wales, exploring Welsh woodworking, including building construction, clog making, and traditional carved Welsh love spoons.
197	1402	"The Carpenter's Tool Box"	8 October 1994
Learn to build Roy's iconic carpenter's tool tote.
198	1403	"Ancient Woodcraft of Ireland"	15 October 1994
Roy looks at Irish woodworking, including houses, harps, caravans and traditional ship-building techniques.
199	1404	"A Sailor's Sea Chest"	22 October 1994
Learn to build a sailor's sea chest with beveled through dovetails.
200	1405	"Oak High Stool with a Hickory Bark Seat"	29 October 1994
Roy builds a stool starting with splitting and riving the green wood and ending with a woven-bark seat.
201	1406	"Standing Embroidery Shop"	5 November 1994
Learn the steps to build a standing embroidery hoop large enough to handle embroidery on a quilt.
202	1407	"The Timber-Frame House"	12 November 1994
Roy builds a scaled model of a Welsh cruck-frame barn, teaching the woodworking principals of timber framing.
203	1408	"Wooden Lock and Key"	19 November 1994
Create a clever wood lock-and-key door set in the shop with Roy.
204	1409	"Shaker Sewing Stand"	26 November 1994
Roy builds a traditional single-drawer Shaker sewing stand.
205	1410	"Panel-Frame Construction"	3 December 1994
Learn the benefits and uses of frame-and-panel construction and the joinery steps to create a frame-and-panel door.
206	1411	"Tools of the Eighteenth Century"	10 December 1994
Roy visits Colonial Williamsburg to view their exhibit of 1,500 eighteenth-century woodworking tools.
207	1412	"The Williamsburg Blacksmiths"	17 December 1994
Watch a traditional woodworking tool -- a drawknife -- forged using historically accurate techniques.
208	1413	"Blacksmiths Forge Ahead! (season finale)"	24 December 1994
In the 14th season finale, Roy learns the steps to smith a Suffolk door latch, a colonial-era design.

== PBS Season 15 (1995) ==
No. overall	No. in season	Title	Original release date
209	1501	"Sharpening Tools (season premiere)"	7 October 1995
Season 15 begins with host Roy Underhill building a cedar box from an old sharpening stone, teaching viewers the principles of sharpening.
210	1502	"Jefferson's Walking Stick-Chair"	14 October 1995
Roy shows you how to make a "walking stick-chair" -- a walking stick that folds out to become a small seat -- much like the one used by Thomas Jefferson.
211	1503	"Chisels, Gouges and Mallets"	21 October 1995
Roy explores the wide, sometimes strange, world of chisels.
212	1504	"Trestle Table"	28 October 1995
Roy makes a "sawbuck" trestle table full of interesting details.
213	1505	"Wooden Scoop Shovel & Spoons"	4 November 1995
Starting with a raw poplar log, Roy splits, chops, cuts and carves a huge wooden shovel.
214	1506	"The Wooden Boat School"	11 November 1995
Roy travels to the Wooden Boat School in Brooklyn, Maine. See three distinct approaches to traditional boat building taught by three different instructors at the school.
215	1507	"The Marionette Makers"	18 November 1995
Roy arrives to find his shop taken over by a gaggle of marionette puppets!
216	1508	"Folding Workbench (Part 1)"	25 November 1995
Begin learning to make a simple, sturdy folding workbench.
217	1509	"Folding Workbench (Part 2)"	2 December 1995
Finish learning how to put the workbench together.
218	1510	"Candlestick Maker"	9 December 1995
Make an adjustable Colonial threaded candle stand.
219	1511	"Boatbuilders of Mystic"	16 December 1995
Visit the shores of Blue Mountain Lake in the Adirondacks for a tour of local woodworking styles.
220	1512	"Williamsburg Trunk Makers"	23 December 1995
Learn how to make a variety of leather items in the harness shop of Jim Clatter in Colonial Williamsburg.
221	1513	"Climbing a Colonial Steeple (season finale)"	30 December 1995
In the 15th season finale, Roy climbs Bruton Parish Steeple in Williamsburg, Virginia, showcasing a bell dating back to the 1770s. The episode details the original construction, offering insights into the lives, work, and thought processes of our ancestors.

== PBS Season 16 (1996) ==
No. overall	No. in season	Title	Original release date
222	1601	"Arts & Crafts Bookcase (season premiere)"	5 October 1996
Season 16 begins with host Roy Underhill learning to recreate a knock-down bookcase originally built by the Roycrofters of East Aurora, New York.
223	1602	"The Secret Dovetailed Box"	12 October 1996
Roy shows how to make a small box using a hidden dovetail joint that looks like a miter joint when complete.
224	1603	"Wood Inlay"	19 October 1996
This episode starts by making a scratch stock tool necessary to create the grooves for the simple Holly inlay that follows.
225	1604	"The Giant Chisels of Gaul"	26 October 1996
Roy visits local blacksmith shops and museums in the Alsace region of France in search of a giant chisel.
226	1605	"Roll-Top Cabinetry"	2 November 1996
Using a roll-top joinery process, Roy creates a small box with tambour doors.
227	1606	"African Drum"	9 November 1996
Roy shows how to build an "African" drum that originally came from colonial America.
228	1607	"Woodcraft of Alsace, France"	16 November 1996
Roy continues his visit to the Alsace region looking at woodworking and timber-building traditions.
229	1608	"Comb-Back Windsor Chair"	23 November 1996
In this two-part project, Roy shows the steps to create a classic comb-back Windsor chair.
230	1609	"Comb-Back Windsor Chair"	30 November 1996
In this two-part project, Roy shows the steps to create a classic comb-back Windsor chair.
231	1610	"Sand-Powered Wooden Toys"	7 December 1996
Roy builds two simple toys: an interlocking-joint puzzle; and a sand powered whirligig.
232	1611	"Cutting the Knuckle-Hinge Joint"	14 December 1996
Learn to create the useful knuckle-hinge joint and, just for fun, whittle a wooden pair of pliers.
233	1612	"Making Wooden Screws"	21 December 1996
Roy shows how to use a tap and screw box to create wooden screws for use in shop and furniture projects.
234	1613	"The Pencil People (season finale)"	28 December 1996
In the 16th season finale, Henry Petroski and Gus Stefureac visit Roy in the shop to learn about the history of writing instruments and the evolution of the pencil, and they examine a variety of vintage pencil sharpeners.

== PBS Season 17 (1997) ==
No. overall	No. in season	Title	Original release date
235	1701	"Make Your Shaving Horse (season premiere)"	4 October 1997
Season 17 begins with host Roy Underhill demonstrating how to make a shaving horse from a single 2x10.
236	1702	"Whittling Chains & Ball-in-Cage"	11 October 1997
Learn to whittle the mysterious, impossible-seeming wooden chain and ball-in-cage.
237	1703	"Windsor Highchair"	18 October 1997
Roy makes a child's Windsor highchair showing classic Windsor techniques.
238	1704	"Chinese Bamboo Chair"	25 October 1997
Make a chair out of grass... Chinese bamboo, that is.
239	1705	"Shaker Boxes"	1 November 1997
Make a NO. 3 bentwood Shaker box -- a deceptively simple design.
240	1706	"Panel-Framed Bench"	8 November 1997
Roy's panel-framed bench has a storage space built beneath the seat.
241	1707	"Hanging Bookcase"	15 November 1997
Using thin wood and only tapered, sliding dovetails, Roy makes a sturdy hanging bookshelf.
242	1708	"Window Sash Restoration"	22 November 1997
Roy takes a rotted window sash and repairs it with weather-resistant resinous wood.
243	1709	"Wooden Tea Machine"	29 November 1997
Make a cam-operated tea bag dunking machine that'll save your arms from the repetitive motion of steeping tea.
244	1710	"Nuts to You"	6 December 1997
How do you get to the center of a walnut? Build a turned, decorated nut cracker, as well as a simpler version from one piece of wood.
245	1711	"Hancock Shaker Village"	13 December 1997
Roy takes a look at interior Shaker craftsmanship at the Hancock Shaker Village in Pittsfield, Mass.
246	1712	"Shaker Side Table"	20 December 1997
Shaker furniture was made as if to be used for 1,000 years -- see how that philosophy is worked into a small table.
247	1713	"Woodworking in Upper Canada (season finale)"	27 December 1997
In the Season 17 finale, Roy travels to Upper Canada to explore the life and economy they built there, enduring harsh winters.

== PBS Season 18 (1998) ==
No. overall	No. in season	Title	Original release date
248	1801	"Dovetailing a Cedar Box (season premiere)"	3 October 1998
The Woodwright's Shop begins its 18th season, with host Roy Underhill learning simple box dovetails and creating some shop characters.
249	1802	"Chip Carving"	10 October 1998
Dress up a small cedar box with a variety of chip carving designs.
250	1803	"Chairs for Children"	17 October 1998
Roy makes a walnut stick chair and a pine slab chair perfectly sized for children.
251	1804	"Bark and Rustic Work"	24 October 1998
Learn the details to add a hickory bark seat to a child's chair.
252	1805	"Debate of the Carpenter's Tools"	31 October 1998
Roy draws on poetry from the 15th century to explain what tools were used by wrights of the day.
253	1806	"Treadle Lathe"	7 November 1998
Build an improved version of Roy's 20-year-old treadle lathe design -- and it starts with scrap lumber!
254	1807	"White Oak Basket"	14 November 1998
A class on basket weaving? You bet! Weave a white oak basket with Roy.
255	1808	"Wall Tool Chest"	21 November 1998
Roy uses a red oak tool chest to illustrate a discussion on hand planes.
256	1809	"Woodworking Gizmos"	28 November 1998
Learn to convert a treadle lathe into a treadle jigsaw.
257	1810	"Traditional Toys"	5 December 1998
Roy shows how to make a traditional Russian pecking-chicken toy.
258	1811	"Old Salem"	12 December 1998
Roy visits Old Salem, North Carolina, founded in the 1760s by the Moravians. Their craft lives on in the recreated town.
259	1812	"Swinging Cradle from Saxony"	19 December 1998
Learn to build a scaled-down German swinging cradle built with lapstrake construction.
260	1813	"Jamestown Woodworkers, 1607 (season finale)"	26 December 1998
In the 18th season finale, Roy explores the history and early settlers of the Jamestown, Virginia, settlement.

== PBS Season 19 (1999) ==
No. overall	No. in season	Title	Original release date
261	1901	"Dovetailing Little Drawers (season premiere)"	2 October 1999
Season 19 begins with host Roy Underhill demonstrating the technique for making small, dovetailed drawers for his hanging tool chest.
262	1902	"The Yoke's on Me"	9 October 1999
Yokes (used to carry watering cans, buckets and more) are a great shaping project using hatchets, spokeshaves and adzes.
263	1903	"Making a Tuckaway Table"	16 October 1999
Roy takes us through the steps to make a clever storable table using a gateleg base.
264	1904	"Chairmaking & Spinning Wheels"	23 October 1999
Chairmaker Lyle Wheeler visits Roy in the shop to demonstrate the construction of a spinning wheel, a project related to chairs.
265	1905	"Master Woodcarver"	30 October 1999
David Calvo visits the shop and shares the basic steps to get started in wood carving.
266	1906	"Building the Clipper 'Amistad'"	6 November 1999
Roy is in Mystic, Connecticut, to visit a shipyard during the rebuilding of the 19th-century clipper ship 'Amistad'.
267	1907	"Two Old-Tool Pioneers"	13 November 1999
Learn about two authors -- Henry Chapman Mercer and Eric Sloane -- whose books have given us an insight into old tools.
268	1908	"Master Cabinetmaker"	20 November 1999
Frank Klausz visits the shop to show how to make his water pond for sharpening and how to cut a through-dovetail.
269	1909	"Sharpen Your Saw"	27 November 1999
Learn the differences between handsaws, as well as the basic steps to sharpen and set a saw.
270	1910	"Wheeled Toys in Wood"	4 December 1999
Roy shows how to make three duck toys for when the weather is right for ducks!
271	1911	"Making the Ladder/Chair"	11 December 1999
Roy builds a classic project -- a chair that converts into a short ladder.
272	1912	"Wayne Barton: Master Chip Carver"	18 December 1999
Master chip carver Wayne Barton visits Roy in the shop and shares his skills.
273	1913	"Bucket Making for Beginners (season finale)"	25 December 1999
In the 19th season finale, Roy learns coopering by constructing a simple bucket.

== PBS Season 20 (2000) ==
In 2000, "The Woodwright's Shop" celebrated its 20th anniversary season.

No. overall	No. in season	Title	Original release date
274	2001	"Lap Desk (season premiere)"	30 September 2000
The show begins its 20th season with host Roy Underhill building a reproduction of a simple 19th-century walnut lap desk.
275	2002	"Turned Corner Chair"	7 October 2000
Roy shows us how to make a c.-1550 three-legged chair from the Flemish town of Rotterdam.
276	2003	"Banjo Man George Wunderlich"	14 October 2000
George Wunderlich recreates a mid-1800s banjo that evolved from African-American gourd banjos.
277	2004	"Writer's Bookcase"	21 October 2000
Learn how to build a small oak bookcase designed for writers. No glue and no fasteners makes it simple to disassemble.
278	2005	"Timber Corner"	28 October 2000
Roy practices large-scale woodworking: the joinery and techniques used in building the corner of a timber-framed structure.
279	2006	"Decoy Carver"	4 November 2000
Nick Supone and Neal Connolly demonstrate the hewing and carving techniques used in creating a quality duck decoy.
280	2007	"Eastfield Village"	11 November 2000
Roy visits Eastfield Village where he joins restoration craftsman Don Carpentier for a tour of the museum's restored historic buildings.
281	2008	"Marquetry Master Patrick Edwards"	18 November 2000
Roy visits with marquetry expert Patrick Edwards to look at the technique of "painting in wood."
282	2009	"In the Blacksmith's Shop"	25 November 2000
Visit with blacksmiths Peter Ross and Ken Schwarz as they show Roy how to make bench chisels and more.
283	2010	"Toys That Make Noise"	2 December 2000
Roy soldiers a tin-can bird whistle and makes a boxwood whistling top.
284	2011	"Carving with the Cabinetmakers"	9 December 2000
Travel to the Hay Cabinet Shop at Colonial Williamsburg for a furniture-carving talk with Master Mack Headley.
285	2012	"Windsor Chair"	16 December 2000
Mike Dunbar of The Windsor Institute demonstrates the steps and techniques for building a sack-back Windsor chair.
286	2013	"20th Anniversary Show (season finale)"	23 December 2000
In the 20th anniversary season finale, Roy celebrates the 20th anniversary of The Woodwright's Shop, featuring highlights from previous episodes, including hand tool accidents, music-making wood, and woodworkers from around the world.

== PBS Season 21 (2001) ==
No. overall	No. in season	Title	Original release date
287	2101	"The Sawhorse (season premiere)"	29 September 2001
Season 21 opens with host Roy Underhill demonstrating the construction of a beautiful sawhorse.
288	2102	"Welsh Chair Bodger Don Weber"	6 October 2001
Roy teams up with the old Welsh Bodger himself and together they demonstrate how to build a classic Welsh Stick Chair.
289	2103	"Toolbox from the 1940s"	13 October 2001
Build a timeless relic from past generations of fine woodworkers - a Joiner's Tool Box.
290	2104	"Rounder Plane"	20 October 2001
An endless "pencil" sharpener to make round tapered handle for rakes, boat spars - and more.
291	2105	"Walnut Krumhorn"	27 October 2001
Get down, get musical! Produce a wonderful old wind instrument from the Elizabethan era - the Krumhorn!
292	2106	"Timber Frame at the Folklife Festival"	3 November 2001
Join Roy at the annual Smithsonian Folklife Festival and learn how to build a timber-frame barn.
293	2107	"Impossible Joints"	10 November 2001
Make a mysterious puzzle mallet with a devilishly difficult dovetail that's impossible to break!
294	2108	"Fools for Tools"	17 November 2001
Roy shows how to find and restore traditional tools needed to do old time traditional woodworking.
295	2109	"Blacksmith Hinges"	24 November 2001
Join Roy at the Anderson Forge in Colonial Williamsburg and see how to make a traditional cross garnet hinge.
296	2110	"Tiny Furniture"	1 December 2001
Learn how to make "big" furniture by starting with scaled down versions.
297	2111	"Window from Williamsburg"	8 December 2001
Learn how to build a four-light Colonial window sash.
298	2112	"Flintlock Gunsmith"	15 December 2001
Roy visits the Gunsmith Shop at Colonial Williamsburg to see how 18th century flintlock rifles were made.
299	2113	"Colonial Tablemaker (season finale)"	22 December 2001
In the Season 21 finale, Roy spins the wheel at the Cabinet Shop in Colonial Williamsburg, demonstrating the production of 18th-century furniture using traditional methods.

== PBS Season 22 (2002) ==
The 300th episode of The Woodwright's Shop airs.

No. overall	No. in season	Title	Original release date
300	2201	"Dovetail a Triangular Box (season premiere)"	28 September 2002
For the 22nd season premiere of The Woodwright's Shop, Roy Underhill constructs a triumphant triangular box, perfect for trifocals.
301	2202	"Shaker Work Table"	5 October 2002
Clever, elegant and delicate beauty. Roy shows you how to produce a wonderful little Shaker work table.
302	2203	"Craftsman Wall Cabinet"	12 October 2002
Roy's bringing craftsmanship back into our lives with an Arts & Crafts style cabinet.
303	2204	"Scandinavian Milking Stool"	19 October 2002
Have fun building a folk milking stool. Think of the possibilities!
304	2205	"Spill Plane and Book Stand"	26 October 2002
What the heck is a spill plane and how do you make a hinged book stand out of one piece of wood?
305	2206	"Canadian Cradle"	2 November 2002
Roy shows how to build a delightful rocking cradle for a newborn baby.
306	2207	"Shutter Dogs from the Blacksmiths"	9 November 2002
Roy learns how to make a shutter dog that is used to hold open shutters when not in use.
307	2208	"Rustic Furniture Maker Dan Mack"	16 November 2002
Meet Dan Mack, and see how he fabricates fascinating furniture out of naturally occurring materials.
308	2209	"Williamsburg Wheelwright"	23 November 2002
Find out what it takes to make a wheel at the Palace Wheelwright Shop in Colonial Williamsburg.
309	2210	"Limberjacks and Dancing Dolls"	30 November 2002
Roy shows you how to build wonderful articulated dancing toys called Limberjacks!
310	2211	"Plymouth Plantation Woodworkers"	7 December 2002
See how the Pilgrims performed early American woodworking with just a few basic tools.
311	2212	"The Colonial Carpenters"	14 December 2002
Learn the difference between a carpenter and a joiner. Hint: Think doors, windows & stairs.
312	2213	"Craftsmen of Old Sturbridge Village (season finale)"	21 December 2002
In the 22nd season finale, Roy visits Old Sturbridge Village to meet an 1830s American farmer/craftsman.

== PBS Season 23 (2003) ==
No. overall	No. in season	Title	Original release date
313	2301	"The Boy Mechanic (season premiere)"	27 September 2003
Season 23 begins with Roy making simple rainy-day projects to "tink" around with, especially if you're young at heart.
314	2302	"Making the New Workbench (Part 1)"	4 October 2003
This two-part project starts with building a solid, sturdy workbench without any screws, nails or glue -- that you can break down and take with you!
315	2303	"Making the New Workbench (Part 2)"	11 October 2003
Part two adds the finishing touches, including vises, dogs and more.
316	2304	"Inlay with Steve Latta"	18 October 2003
Beautiful "compass inlay" on a Pennsylvania spice box done in the Pennsylvania/German tradition.
317	2305	"Using Planes"	25 October 2003
Jack planes, combination planes, single iron joiners -- Roy introduces you to the world of planes -- not to mention snipe spills, skew mouth badgers and iron rabbits.
318	2306	"Roundabout Chair"	1 November 2003
Learn how to build an odd corner chair -- called a Roundabout Chair -- found in the offices of Dr. Sigmund Freud.
319	2307	"Carving with Calvo"	8 November 2003
Need a sign? Let David Calvo show you how to carve one.
320	2308	"Woodcraft of the Southern Highlands"	15 November 2003
Take a trip to beautiful downtown Paint Lick, KY and meet the old bodger himself, Don Weber. Learn how it was done in the old country.
321	2309	"Woodcraft at Conner Prairie"	22 November 2003
Explore Conner Prairie, a living museum in the heart of Indiana. See how life was in the 1800s.
322	2310	"The Turning Triangle Table"	29 November 2003
How do you turn a round table into a triangle. Let Roy show you how.
323	2311	"Child's Rocker and Sliding Dovetail Stool"	6 December 2003
Roy shows you how to make something useful out of scrap wood.
324	2312	"The First American Woodworkers"	13 December 2003
Learn how the very first Americans worked with wood -- the Cherokees of Cherokee Nation.
325	2313	"Paneled Cedar Chest (season finale)"	20 December 2003
In the Season 23 finale, Roy constructs a beautiful red cedar chest from wood salvaged from a tree downed by a hurricane.

== PBS Season 24 (2004) ==
No. overall	No. in season	Title	Original release date
326	2401	"Shaving Horse (season premiere)"	25 September 2004
The 24th season of The Woodwright's Shop begins with host Roy Underhill crafting a shaving horse, which can be used to make ax handles, wheel spokes, and more.
327	2402	"Tinsmithing with Anne Pederson"	2 October 2004
Anne Pederson joins Roy in the shop by demonstrating tinsmithing.
328	2403	"Acadian Chair"	9 October 2004
Roy discusses the Acadians, forebears of the Cajuns, brought a clever idea for a chair with them to Louisiana.
329	2404	"White Cooperage with Norm Pederson"	16 October 2004
If you need a washtub, butter churn or water bucket -- go see a "white cooper."
330	2405	"The Foot-Power Lathe"	23 October 2004
Roy shows how to build a "spring pole lathe" -- powered by foot.
331	2406	"Wooden Thread Cutter"	30 October 2004
Need a big ol' wooden screw for your cider press? Roy will show you how to make one.
332	2407	"Woodworking at the North House Folk School"	6 November 2004
Take a class in kayak building, or build along bow or a berry basket -- all available at the North Folk School.
333	2408	"Turned and Hewn Bowls and Spoons"	13 November 2004
Watch Roy transform a big log into a beautiful bowl. Hint: Just remove everything that's not a bowl.
334	2409	"Norwegian Pram and Snow Skis with Mark Hansen"	20 November 2004
Let it snow, then go skiing with Mark Hensen.
335	2410	"One-Piece Woodworking"	27 November 2004
Let Roy show you how to make useful & "useless" things out of one piece of wood -- no kidding.
336	2411	"Turning Chess Pieces"	4 December 2004
Roy shows you how to make a standard chess set or a not so standard chess set. Check, Matey!
337	2412	"Chess Board and Box"	11 December 2004
Now that you have the chess pieces it's time to make the chess board -- and a box to put the pieces in.
338	2413	"Inlaid Legs with Steve Latta (season finale)"	18 December 2004
In the Season 24 finale, Steve Latta joins Roy in the shop to demonstrate beautiful inlaid legs.

== PBS Season 25 (2005) ==
No. overall	No. in season	Title	Original release date
339	2501	"Garden Bench (season premiere)"	1 October 2005
Season 25 opens with Roy constructing a small Cypress garden bench featuring a Southeast Asian design.
340	2502	"Wooden Puzzles"	8 October 2005
Avoid being frustrated by wooden puzzles by making a wooden knot, and three burr puzzles yourself.
341	2503	"Jeff Headley, Cabinetmaker"	15 October 2005
Jeff Headley and Steve Hamilton visit the shop to show the construction techniques - and secrets - in a Winchester slant-top desk.
342	2504	"The Melencolia Plane"	22 October 2005
Build the wooden plane pictured in Albrecht Durer's Melancolia.
343	2505	"Three Chests of Tools"	29 October 2005
Join Roy as he inventories woodworking tools he found in three tool chests.
344	2506	"Woodturning Wisdom"	5 November 2005
Roy discusses the "perfection along the axis" found in woodturning.
345	2507	"Niddy Noddy and Weaver's Swift"	12 November 2005
Build two accessories valuable to the weaver.
346	2508	"Cabinet Workbench"	19 November 2005
In a two-episode project, Roy builds a workbench with storage underneath from a design from Charles Hayward. In this first episode, Roy builds the case.
347	2509	"Workbench Door and Drawers"	26 November 2005
In a two-episode project, Roy builds a workbench with storage underneath from a design from Charles Hayward. In this second episode, Roy finishes with the door and drawers.
348	2510	"Nora Hall, Woodcarver"	3 December 2005
Nora Hall visits Roy in the shop and demonstrates how to carve a linenfold design.
349	2511	"Country Chair Seats"	10 December 2005
David Russell demonstrates corn-shuck chair seats to Roy in the shop.
350	2512	"The Museum of Appalachia"	17 December 2005
Roy discovers the history of Appalachian people at the museum in Clinton, TN.
351	2513	"Restoring Jefferson's and Madison's Homes (season finale)"	24 December 2005
In the 25th season finale, Roy visits Monticello, Poplar Forest, and Montpelier to examine the work of the two men responsible for much of the construction and woodworking.

== PBS Season 26 (2006) ==
No. overall	No. in season	Title	Original release date
352	2601	"A Ship in a Bottle (season premiere)"	30 September 2006
Season 26 opens with Roy demonstrating the construction of ships in a bottle.
353	2602	"Barley Twist Table (Part 1)"	7 October 2006
In this two-episode project, Roy builds a project from the time of the English Civil War between Scotland, England & Wales (c. 1650).
354	2603	"Barley Twist Table (Part 2)"	14 October 2006
In this two-episode project, Roy builds a project from the time of the English Civil War between Scotland, England & Wales (c. 1650).
355	2604	"Rustic Chairs With Skye Gregson"	21 October 2006
Visit the beautiful Adirondack Mountains of New York and see how a lovely young lady makes wonderful rustic chairs out of sticks - no two alike.
356	2605	"Windsor Highchair With Curtis Buchanan (Part 1)"	28 October 2006
In another two-episode project, Roy learns how to build an elegant Windsor Highchair. Part one deals with the bottom half and demonstrates Curtis's wonderful turning techniques, while part two deals with making the top half of the chair. The techniques demonstrated here involve spindle making & steam shaping.
357	2606	"Windsor Highchair With Curtis Buchanan (Part 2)"	4 November 2006
In another two-episode project, Roy learns how to build an elegant Windsor Highchair. Part one deals with the bottom half and demonstrates Curtis's wonderful turning techniques, while part two deals with making the top half of the chair. The techniques demonstrated here involve spindle making & steam shaping.
358	2607	"The Spirit of Woodcraft"	11 November 2006
Zen Master Roy discusses jedi woodworking. Ohmmmm.
359	2608	"Japanese Planes With John Reed Fox"	18 November 2006
Roy & John reveal the key to Japanese woodcraft through the use of planes, saws and chisels.
360	2609	"An English Garden Wheelbarrow (Part 1)"	25 November 2006
And yet one more two-part project, where Roy demonstrates that to build a wheelbarrow, first you have to build a wheel. Then you add the carriage part to finish the wheelbarrow.
361	2610	"An English Garden Wheelbarrow (Part 2)"	2 December 2006
And yet one more two-part project, where Roy demonstrates that to build a wheelbarrow, first you have to build a wheel. Then you add the carriage part to finish the wheelbarrow.
362	2611	"Upholstering Your Seat"	9 December 2006
It's no good having a good chair without a good seat. Learn how to make your chair comfortable to sit on.
363	2612	"Old Woodworking Machines"	16 December 2006
Watch as Roy explores an old timey wimey woodworking shop run by belts and pulleys.
364	2613	"The Dovetail Variations (season finale)"	23 December 2006
In the Season 26 finale, Roy discusses variations of the dovetail.

== PBS Season 27 (2007) ==
No. overall	No. in season	Title	Original release date
365	2701	"Peter & the Box (season premiere)"	29 September 2007
In the Season 27 premiere, Roy discusses how simple yet elegant 17th-century boxes are highly valued.
366	2702	"Ball & Socket Embroidery Stand (Part 1)"	6 October 2007
This two-part project is charming! An 18th century ball & socket embroidery stand that any wife would love to have. Learn to build the set-screw, the bentwood hoops and the yoke to complete the stand.
367	2703	"Ball & Socket Embroidery Stand (Part 2)"	13 October 2007
This two-part project is charming! An 18th century ball & socket embroidery stand that any wife would love to have. Learn to build the set-screw, the bentwood hoops and the yoke to complete the stand.
368	2704	"Screw Box for Wooden Threads"	20 October 2007
Wooden screws - wonderful, useful, beautiful and intriguing. Learn how to make your own.
369	2705	"French Work Bench (Part 1)"	27 October 2007
Ooh la la! Another two-part project, and it's a beautiful workbench! Only a French bench could be this pretty.
370	2706	"French Work Bench (Part 2)"	3 November 2007
Ooh la la! Another two-part project, and it's a beautiful workbench! Only a French bench could be this pretty.
371	2707	"Violin Maker Joe Thrift"	10 November 2007
Roy & Joe show you how to make a fiddle - copied from a Stradivarius of course.
372	2708	"Candle Box With Secret Drawer"	17 November 2007
In the 1700s, a box was needed to store your candles. Roy shows how to build one of these unique & interesting boxes.
373	2709	"Parallelogram Plant Stand"	24 November 2007
An adjustable stand for various size potted plants. Roy works with both wood and metal.
374	2710	"German Woodcraft in America"	1 December 2007
Roy visits an old German workshop in Old Salem, NC.
375	2711	"Woodworking With Tillers International"	8 December 2007
Roy visits Tillers International just east of Kalamazoo, MI where they teach all sorts of rural trades - the old fashioned way.
376	2712	"The Sordid Blacksmith"	15 December 2007
Roy visits the blacksmith shop in Colonial Williamsburg and explores the "vulgar" art of blacksmithing.
377	2713	"Henry Ford’s Museum Village (season finale)"	22 December 2007
In the 27th season finale, Roy visits Henry Ford's Greenfield Village, showcasing American heritage and individuals who made a difference.

== PBS Season 28 (2008) ==
No. overall	No. in season	Title	Original release date
378	2801	"The Governor's PoBoy (season premiere)"	27 September 2008
Governor Mike Easley of North Carolina joins host Roy Underhill in the shop for the Season 28 premiere, explaining how and why he built a "poboy" table.
379	2802	"Joiner's Tool Chest (Part 1)"	4 October 2008
A carpenter's tool chest, more valuable than a load of gold (according to Robinson Crusoe). In this two-episode project Roy shows how to build a smaller version – a joiner's tool chest.
380	2803	"Joiner's Tool Chest (Part 2)"	11 October 2008
A carpenter's tool chest, more valuable than a load of gold (according to Robinson Crusoe). In this two-episode project Roy shows how to build a smaller version – a joiner's tool chest.
381	2804	"Thomas Jefferson's Bookstand"	18 October 2008
A book stand that supported five open books at one time which Thomas Jefferson could use as a "research center."
382	2805	"Classical Carving"	25 October 2008
Roy and a master carver from Colonial Williamsburg explore 50 years of 18th century carving.
383	2806	"File Philosophy"	1 November 2008
A blacksmith's job is not completely done at the forge. After the hammering stops, the filing commences.
384	2807	"A Very Boring Program"	8 November 2008
Boring becomes exciting as demonstrated by Roy.
385	2808	"Lumberjack Fan Carving"	15 November 2008
Roy and a master of the ancient folk art of Lumberjack Fan Carving show you how it's done.
386	2809	"Animated Wooden Toys"	22 November 2008
Wooden toys that inspire the imagination and make the world a better place.
387	2810	"Holly Wood Spectaculars"	29 November 2008
An incredible tool chest for small tools built with holly wood and decorated with spectacular inlay. Marcus Hanson & Ed Wright from Colonial Williamsburg show us the top of the tool till of Benjamin Seaton’s tool chest.
388	2811	"Hammer Veneer"	6 December 2008
With a little help from his friends Marcus Hanson & Ed Wright from Colonial Williamsburg, Roy shows how to do hammer veneer – handy for making drawer fronts (here using the tool chest of Benjamin Seaton as example).
389	2812	"A Viking Tool Chest"	13 December 2008
Roy and his friend, Don Weber, discuss the treasures found in a very old Viking tool chest and how to reproduce them.
390	2813	"Woodworking in Berea (season finale)"	20 December 2008
In the Season 28 finale, Roy explores the area around Berea, Kentucky, revealing its rich history and enduring connection to woodworking.

== PBS Season 29 (2009) ==
The 400th episode of The Woodwright's Shop airs.

No. overall	No. in season	Title	Original release date
391	2901	"Dovetailed Grease Pot (season premiere)"	26 September 2009
Season 29 opens with Roy demonstrating the construction of a clever grease pot – a box for storing grease used in tool maintenance.
392	2902	"Secrets of the Whirlygig"	3 October 2009
Make the world a better place by building a woodworking whirlygig!
393	2903	"Shaker Rocker Frame"	10 October 2009
The first step to making a rocking chair is making the frame, which Roy does out of a hickory log.
394	2904	"Shaker Rocker Seat"	17 October 2009
Now that the frame is done, it's time to make the seat, the arm rests and the rockers.
395	2905	"Mary May, Woodcarver"	24 October 2009
Master woodcarver Mary May shows how to carve a classic "acanthus leaf."
396	2906	"Wood & Water"	31 October 2009
"Green" wood is 50 percent water. Roy demonstrates that it is important to know which tools work best with wood at this stage.
397	2907	"Steam Power Sawmill"	7 November 2009
Full steam ahead! Roy takes you on a journey into the past when he visits a steam-powered sawmill.
398	2908	"Harvard Side Table"	14 November 2009
The Shakers of northern Massachusetts may have called this a side table, but it's plenty large enough for any dining needs.
399	2909	"A Crutch in Time"	21 November 2009
Should you ever need a crutch to get around (and let's hope you don't), Roy shows you how to build one.
400	2910	"Hancock Pedestal Table"	28 November 2009
Roy builds a classic and elegant round pedestal table, first made by the craftsmen at Hancock Shaker Village.
401	2911	"Brian Boggs, Chairmaker"	5 December 2009
Master chairmaker, master teacher and master innovator, Brian Boggs, discusses chairmaking.
402	2912	"Corner Cupboard (Part 1)"	12 December 2009
In this two-episode project, Roy first shows how to build the glazed-window door at the top of the cupboard.
403	2913	"Corner Cupboard (Part 2) (season finale)"	19 December 2009
In the Season 29 finale, Roy builds the panel door for the bottom of the cupboard.

== PBS Season 30 (2010) ==
Starting with this season, host Roy Underhill celebrated the 30th anniversary of The Woodwright's Shop.

No. overall	No. in season	Title	Original release date
404	3001	"Case of the Corner Cupboard (season premiere)"	25 September 2010
The Woodwright's Shop celebrates its 30th anniversary season, with host Roy Underhill demonstrating the use of custom jigs to hand plane a precise joint.
405	3002	"Making Marvelous Moldings"	2 October 2010
You can make any complex molding you want with simple hand planes - just take it one curve at a time. Bill Anderson and Roy show how to flute your pilasters and carve your cornice for this comely corner cupboard.
406	3003	"Mind Over Miter"	9 October 2010
Learn all the angles and see how to carefully cut corners to master the miter box for fitting frames and fine furniture.
407	3004	"The Till in the Tool Chest"	16 October 2010
Delve into the drawers in search of the secret of an old tool chest. The quality of the tools shows that it belonged to a first-class joiner back in the early 19th century, but the dovetail joints break all the rules.
408	3005	"Continuous Arm Rocking Chair - Part 1"	23 October 2010
Chairmaker Elia Bizzarri makes an elegant and comfortable rocking chair. We'll turn the legs and frame the seat in part one of this American classic.
409	3006	"Continuous Arm Rocking Chair - Part 2"	30 October 2010
We'll finish our rocking chair as we steam and bend the continuous arm's one-piece back. With its compound bend, this challenging chair is truly an American design innovation.
410	3007	"Who Wrote the Book of Sloyd?"	6 November 2010
Sloyd, the late 19th-century Swedish system of learning woodworking, was intended to develop skilled, industrious and morally upstanding citizens. We'll give it a try, and hope it's not too late for us!
411	3008	"The Case for Books"	13 November 2010
Say goodbye to cinder blocks and sagging shelves as you see how to cut the essential dado and sliding joints to build this better bookcase.
412	3009	"Sawing Secrets"	20 November 2010
Chris Schwarz, editor of Popular Woodworking Magazine, joins Roy to explore the three classes of English sawcuts. Chris reveals the devious French tenon cheat and even shows us how to saw without a saw.
413	3010	"The Tiny Tool Kit"	27 November 2010
How can you stretch a basic kit of tools to build impressive casework? Chris Schwarz, editor of Popular Woodworking Magazine, shows how with the toolkit of young Thomas, hero of the 1839 book The Joiner and Cabinet Maker.
414	3011	"Thomas Day, Cabinetmaker"	4 December 2010
In the days of slavery, Thomas Day, a free black cabinetmaker in North Carolina, was one of the most respected artisans in the South. Look beneath the veneer on his furniture and discover his intriguing architectural work.
415	3012	"Oak Field Gate"	11 December 2010
Mortise and tenon joints frame this classic feature of the English countryside. It's a rustic woodworking challenge to balance both beauty and strength that will keep the gate swinging for decades.
416	3013	"Field Gate Hinges (season finale)"	18 December 2010
In the 30th season finale, Master blacksmith Peter Ross joins host Roy Underhill to forge iron hinges for an oak field gate. Learn how to shape and weld wrought iron for straps and pintles to make the gate swing true.

== PBS Season 31 (2011) ==
No. overall	No. in season	Title	Original release date
417	3101	"The Roubo Bookstand (season premiere)"	September 2011
Season 31 opens with host Roy Underhill constructing a folding desktop bookstand, as featured in André Roubo's "L’art du Menuisier."
418	3102	"As the Saw Turns"	2011
Bill Anderson visits the shop to share the steps to make an elegant and well-designed bow saw.
419	3103	"Hurray for Hickory!"	2011
Roy celebrates the quality and versatility of hickory.
420	3104	"Painless Panel Doors"	2011
Learn the intricacies and valuable qualities of frame-and-panel doors as you build one with Roy!
421	3105	"Hand Plane Essentials with Chris Schwarz"	2011
Christopher Schwarz visits the shop to discuss the care and use of hand planes.
422	3106	"English Layout Square with Chris Schwarz"	2011
Build a classic layout square found in an auction catalog.
423	3107	"Elizabethan Joint Stool with Peter Follansbee"	2011
Peter Follansbee and Megan Fitzpatrick stop by to share the steps to make an English joint stool.
424	3108	"Carving Swedish Spoons with Peter Follansnbee"	2011
Learn the basics on a classic carving project with Peter Follansbee.
425	3109	"Inlaid Lettering with Steve Latta"	2011
Steve Latta shares his skill at doing letter inlay on furniture pieces.
426	3110	"Hammer Veneering with Steve Latta"	2011
Learn the secrets of the 3,000-year-old technique of hammer veneering.
427	3111	"Iron Work for Timber Work"	2011
Roy visits blacksmith Peter Ross to discuss the iron work necessary for doing timber work.
428	3112	"Offset Turning"	2011
Learn how to turn an oval on the lathe (great for tool handles and more!).
429	3113	"Simple Sash (season finale)"	2011
In the Season 31 finale, Roy crafts a replacement sash window for a historic building.

== PBS Season 32 (2012) ==
No. overall	No. in season	Title	Original release date
430	3201	"Rise of the Machines! (season premiere)"	22 September 2012
Season 32 kicks off with host Roy Underhill exploring a collection of century-old, foot-powered woodworking machines.
431	3202	"The Eleven Grooved Box"	29 September 2012
Grooves and splines make a tidy oak box, but can the joints be cut by just using hand tools?
432	3203	"Table Joints Rule!"	6 October 2012
You can't make a drop-leaf table without the rule joint. See the tools needed to cut it by hand.
433	3204	"The Anarchist’s Tool Chest"	13 October 2012
Chris Schwarz's anarchist's tool chest starts a back-to-basics revolution!
434	3205	"Two Screws for You!"	20 October 2012
Chris Schwarz joins Roy Underhill to rediscover the enigmatic, wooden, two-screw vise.
435	3206	"Screw Cuttin' Lathe"	27 October 2012
Roy uses an 1889 foot-powered lathe to cut perfect threads, cones, and tapers in iron and brass.
436	3207	"The Troublesome Triangle Stool"	3 November 2012
Peter Follansbee and Roy Underhill tackle terrible turned tenons for the old triangular stool.
437	3208	"Wretched Ratchet Reading Rack"	10 November 2012
With foot-powered lathes, Peter Follansbee turns this adjustable book stand from walnut and maple.
438	3209	"Raising Panel-Zona"	17 November 2012
Roy Underhill uses both complex planes and tricks with basic tools to raise the classic panel.
439	3210	"Carving the Camellia"	24 November 2012
Woodcarver Mary May makes basswood flowers bloom. Get in the groove of high-relief carving with sharp gouges and good-grained wood!
440	3211	"Forging the Hold Fast"	1 December 2012
Blacksmith Peter Ross shows how to forge historical versions of this powerful gripper.
441	3212	"The Enfield Cupboard"	8 December 2012
Simple to construct and elegant in design, this cupboard is a standby in any room or shop
442	3213	"The Shaker Bend (season finale)"	15 December 2012
In the Season 32 finale, Roy discusses how the Shakers may be our most modern artisans.

== PBS Season 33 (2013) ==
No. overall	No. in season	Title	Original release date
443	3301	"Rachell's Standing Desk (season premiere)"	September 2013
In the Season 33 premiere, host Roy Underhill constructs tenon and dovetail joints to assemble a pine standing desk from Pennsylvania.
444	3302	"Rachell's Standing Desk 2"	2013
The miter-clamped breadboard end makes a broad desktop that always stays flat.
445	3303	"The Venerable Bead"	2013
Roy Underhill demonstrates how to cut bead moldings with hand planes for corners that look sharp and last longer.
446	3304	"Carving Away with Mary May"	2013
Classical carver Mary May provides a lesson on woodcarving and a proper rebuke for edge tool abuse!
447	3305	"Swinging Saw Vise"	2013
Roy duplicates the beveled bridle joints and chamfered chops of an old saw-sharpening vise
448	3306	"Sharpen That Saw!"	2013
Using giant model rip and crosscut saws, Roy demonstrates how to correctly sharpen handsaws
449	3307	"Combination Planes"	2013
Roy attempts to replace a chest of molding planes with one complex metal contraption.
450	3308	"Joined Chest with Peter Follansbee"	2013
The master joiner of Plymouth Plantation shows how to frame a small, mortised, and tenoned chest in the old English style.
451	3309	"Paneled Chest with Peter Follansbee"	2013
A master joiner shows Roy how to make and fit the beveled panels and storage till into a framed chest from the Pilgrim era.
452	3310	"Early Iron with Peter Ross"	2013
Master blacksmith Peter Ross shows how to forge iron hinges and locks from the earliest days of the American experience.
453	3311	"Try Square with Christopher Schwarz"	2013
Chris Schwarz shows Roy how to measure up with an English try square based on the examples in the famous Benjamin Seaton tool chest.
454	3312	"Dutch Tool Chest with Christopher Schwarz"	2013
Learn to make the simple and useful Dutch tool chest with its characteristic 30-degree slanted lid.
455	3313	"Big Ash Mallet! (season finale)"	2013
In the Season 33 finale, Roy demonstrates how to construct a traditional joiner's mallet.

== PBS Season 34 (2014) ==
No. overall	No. in season	Title	Original release date
456	3401	"Taming The Timber Bench (season premiere)"	September 2014
For the 34th season premiere of The Woodwright's Shop, Roy Underhill demonstrates the construction of a German carpenter's bench, highlighting the use of stopped sliding dovetails.
457	3402	"Pinch Rod and Squeezy Blocks"	2014
This pair of sliding diagonal rods with copper collars will help you get your chests square.
458	3403	"Tapered Tail Tripod Table 1"	2014
Walnut legs riven from the log begin this table inspired by the 19th century Dominy workshops.
459	3404	"Tapered Tail Tripod Table 2"	2014
A walnut burl top and some tricky turning make tapered dovetails for our three-legged table.
460	3405	"Viceless Devices"	2014
From the holdfast to the birdsmouth, Roy explores wondrous ways to grip the grain.
461	3406	"Daring Diagonal Dovetails"	2014
Learn to cut the rising diagonal dovetail for corners that are stronger and striking.
462	3407	"Shop Class Tabouret"	2014
The old shop-class plant stand joined with half-laps and dowels teaches us to focus on the grain.
463	3408	"Campaign Furniture"	2014
Campaign furniture made for travel to the far-flung reaches of the Empire are highlighted.
464	3409	"Fitting Brass"	2014
Discover how to fit brass corners and hardware flush with the surfaces of Campaign furniture.
465	3410	"The Crotch and the Horse"	2014
An old shaving horse from the Virginia mountains showcases the strength of natural shapes in timber.
466	3411	"Dovetail Saw"	2014
Tom Calisto makes a brass-backed hand saw perfect for the finest dovetails or the toughest tenons.
467	3412	"Tempered Steel"	2014
Peter Ross shows how to forge, weld and temper tool steel for cutting edges that stay sharp longer.
468	3413	"Woodwright! - The Musical (season finale)"	2014
As The Woodwright's Shop concludes its 34th season, the Underhill Rose band joins Roy in the shop for a musical misadventure.

== PBS Season 35 (2015) ==
Starting with this season, Roy Underhill celebrates 35 years of The Woodwright's Shop.

No. overall	No. in season	Title	Original release date
469	3501	"Rocky Bentwood Cradle Show (season premiere)"	19 September 2015
For the 35th season premiere, Roy crafts a rocking cradle, inspired by one found in the Grand Bazaar of Istanbul.
470	3502	"Rocky Bentwood Cradle Show II"	26 September 2015
Conclusion. A rocking cradle is completed with pine sides and rockers. A lathe-turned carrier bar joins it all together.
471	3503	"Stamp Out Cookie Carving!"	3 October 2015
How to carve springerle cookie molds.
472	3504	"Double Drawer Shaker Table"	10 October 2015
How to cut the mortise and tenon joints for the legs and frame of a Shaker table.
473	3505	"Groovers & Shakers"	17 October 2015
The dovetailed and grooved construction techniques found inside Shaker drawers are detailed.
474	3506	"Turning Shaker Knobs"	24 October 2015
Cherry knobs for Shaker furniture are turned on a foot-powered lathe. Also: finishing a joined table top.
475	3507	"Cross Cut Conundrum"	31 October 2015
How to use a cross-cutting wood saw.
476	3508	"Bowl Carving With Peter Follansbee"	7 November 2015
Large bowls are made from poplar and sycamore wood.
477	3509	"Hollows & Rounds"	14 November 2015
A look at making and using wooden hollows and rounds.
478	3510	"Welsh Stick Chair"	21 November 2015
How to make a Welsh stick chair, which is a country cousin to the Windsor chair.
479	3511	"Welsh Stick Chair II"	28 November 2015
Work on the Welsh stick chair continues. Included: shaping the spindles and back.
480	3512	"Tool Smithing With Peter Ross"	5 December 2015
Making dividers, calipers and turning tools with forge and anvil.
481	3513	"Plain Pine Box (season finale)"	12 December 2015
As The Woodwright's Shop concludes its 35th season, Roy makes a traditional pine coffin.

== PBS Season 36 (2016) ==
No. overall	No. in season	Title	Original release date
482	3601	"Van Gogh's Chair (season premiere)"	17 September 2016
Kicking off the 36th season, Roy brings Vincent van Gogh's masterpiece back to life as a post-impressionistic, ladder-back version of his famous chair.
483	3602	"Sliding Lid Boxes"	24 September 2016
Roy shows how to create easy-to-make wooden gift boxes with mitered corners and lids that slide in grooves.
484	3603	"Carved Oak Desk Box"	1 October 2016
Master of Pilgrim-century furniture Peter Follansbee joins Roy to make a slope-lidded, carved box from carved white and red oak.
485	3604	"Waving Arm Whirlygigs"	8 October 2016
Figures from history including Benjamin Franklin and Muhammad Ali inspire Roy's new line of waving arm wooden whirlygigs.
486	3605	"Wedged Tusk Tenon"	15 October 2016
Roy and workbench builder Will Myers test out the strength of the classic wedged mortise and tenon joint for take-apart furniture.
487	3606	"Swedish Shrink Box"	22 October 2016
Woodworker Peter Follansbee shows Roy Underhill how to make Swedish shrink boxes from hollowed wood with inserted bottoms.
488	3607	"Saw Like a Butterfly!"	29 October 2016
The great poet-athlete Muhammad Ali inspires the best lessons in woodworking – Saw Like a Butterfly, Plane Like a Bee!
489	3608	"Firewood Carrier"	5 November 2016
Chair-maker Elia Bizzarri shows Roy how to make a split oak firewood carrier inspired by the classic wooden harvest rake.
490	3609	"Double Casement Window"	12 November 2016
Roy Underhill makes a double, swinging casement window using wooden planes and premium pine.
491	3610	"Tool Chest Hinges & Latch"	19 November 2016
How to forge hinges and latches for a replica tool chest.
492	3611	"Tool Chest From Bristol"	26 November 2016
How to dovetail a stout, sloped top tool chest.
493	3612	"Roman Work Bench"	3 December 2016
The secrets of the ancient Roman woodworker's bench.
494	3613	"Staked Furniture (season finale)"	10 December 2016
In the Season 36 finale, Roy discusses how a plank with inserted legs can be used to create a chair, table, or bench.

== PBS Season 37 (2017) ==
No. overall	No. in season	Title	Original release date
495, 410	3701	"Who Wrote the Book of Sloyd?"	24 August 2017
Sloyd, the late 19th century Swedish system of learning woodworking was intended to develop skilled, industrious, and morally upstanding citizens. We’ll give it a try, and hope it’s not too late for us! This is a repeat of 410, Season 30 Episode 7.
496, 387	3702	"Holly Wood Spectaculars"	25 August 2017
Marcus Hansen and Edward Wright show how to create decorative veneer patterns using oval engines, sharp knives, and patient perfectionism. This is a repeat of 387, Season 28 Episode 10.
471, 417	3703	"The Roubo Bookstand"	25 August 2017
One piece of walnut makes a beautiful bookstand as we follow the formula of an old French master. This is a repeat of 417, Season 31 Episode 1.
472, 430	3704	"Rise of the Machines!"	25 August 2017
Why do it by hand – when you can do it by foot? Roy Underhill gets caught up in a bevy of century-old, foot-powered woodworking machines. This is a repeat of 430, Season 32 Episode 1.
473, 421	3705	"Hand Plane Essentials with Chris Schwarz"	19 September 2017
Learn how to make gleaming surfaces, tight joints and crisp moldings through perfect planing. This is a repeat of 421, Season 31 Episode 5.
474, 455	3706	"Big Ash Mallet!"	19 September 2017
Make a proper joiner’s mallet and you’ll never be lonely again! With ash head and hickory handle, Roy shows how to make a mallet for the ages. This is a repeat of 455, Season 33 Episode 13.
475, 446	3707	"Carving Away with Mary May"	19 September 2017
Classical carver Mary May gives Roy his first lessons on woodcarving – along with a proper rebuke for edge tool abuse! This is a repeat of 446, Season 33 Episode 4.
476, 391	3708	"Dovetailed Grease Pot"	19 September 2017
Walnut and boxwood make a little box with a secret lock to stash the woodworker’s pal. This is a repeat of 391, Season 29 Episode 1.
