= Jessamyn West (librarian) =

American librarian and activist (born 1968)

- Born: September 5, 1968 (age 58); Concord, Massachusetts, U.S.
- Occupations: Librarian, blogger
- Known for: librarian.net
- Father: Tom West
- Jessamyn West's voice recorded September 14, 2014
- Website: www.jessamyn.info

Jessamyn Charity West (born September 5, 1968) is an American library technologist and writer known for her activism and work on the digital divide. She is the creator of librarian.net. She was the Vermont Chapter Councilor of the American Library Association, and was Director of Operations at the group blog MetaFilter from 2005 to 2014.

== Early life and education ==
West grew up in Massachusetts, where her father, computer engineer Tom West, worked for RCA and Data General. He was the key figure in the 1981 Tracy Kidder book The Soul of a New Machine. Her mother, Elizabeth (née Cohon), was the younger sister of actor Peter Coyote. She may be named after the author Jessamyn West (according to her parents, a "coincidence"), and as a child corresponded with her.

She graduated from Hampshire College in Amherst. She completed graduate work at the University of Washington for a Master of Librarianship degree, and moved back to Vermont in 2003.

== Career ==
In 1995, West went to Cluj-Napoca in Romania, where she ran a library for the Freedom Forum.

West works as a freelance library consultant, mainly in Orange County, Vermont, focusing on helping libraries with technology. She moderated the group blog MetaFilter, retiring as Director of Operations in 2014. She is also an active Wikipedian, working particularly on Vermont and library topics. In June 2011 she joined the Wikimedia Foundation Advisory Board. She has staffed information desks at Burning Man and the 1999 WTO protests, and supported and maintained the Internet Archive's Open Library project.

West briefly signed up as a researcher for Google Answers, writing about her experience for the journal Searcher. She resigned after finding she had probably violated her contract by writing about the service. She believed that "the money factor" skewed the relationship between the researcher and consumer of information, and played a part in the service's later demise.

In 2002, Library Journal named her a "mover and shaker" of the library world. West is considered an "opinion maker" in the profession and presents frequently at conferences. In 2019 she gave the 30th Alice G. Smith Lecture for the School of Information at the University of South Florida in Tampa at the Robert W. Saunders Sr. Public Library, titled "Social justice is a library issue; libraries are a social justice issue". She addressed challenges faced by people in rural communities on The Takeaway podcast in September 2019, "How Libraries Are Bridging the Digital Divide". She is a self-described anti-capitalist.

From 2016 to 2018, West taught library and information science at the University of Hawaiʻi at Mānoa. Since 2018, she has been a qualifying authority for the Internet Archive. In a 2022 interview on the Slate podcast "Working", she described herself as a "rural tech evangelist" who is committed to helping to alleviate the digital divide. In 2023, West joined the Flickr Foundation as Community Manager for the Flickr Commons.

In 2026 West published the guide, How to Disable or Avoid Intrusive AI.

== Librarian.net ==
librarian.net
- Website type: blog
- Available in: English
- Owner: Jessamyn West
- Creator: Jessamyn West
- Website: www.librarian.net
- Launched: 1999
- Current status: active

Librarian.net, which she founded in 1999 after finding the domain name unused, has become a "widely read and cited" resource. West characterizes librarian.net as generally "anti-censorship, pro-freedom of speech, pro-porn (for lack of a better way to explain that we don't find the naked body shameful), anti-globalization, anti-outsourcing, anti-Dr. Laura, pro-freak, pro-social responsibility, and just generally pro-information and in favor of the profession getting a better image."

West was one of about three dozen "credentialed bloggers" at the 2004 Democratic National Convention, the first time that such an event issued press credentials to bloggers. She indicated in a New York Times feature on the group that her goal was making "the librarian voice in politics stronger and louder." Her first-day quip that the convention was "Burning Man for Democrats, without the nudity or drugs" was widely reported.

In 2007, West made a YouTube video of herself installing Ubuntu on two library computers, which attracted thousands of views and requests for free CDs from Canonical. DesktopLinux.com called it a "non-jaded, non-techie look at Ubuntu". Cory Doctorow, writing on the blog Boing Boing, dubbed her an "internet folk hero", and brought the video 14,000 views in a day and a half.

== Activism ==
Library sign designed by Jessamyn West

West describes herself as a "collectivist kind of anarchist". Wired described her as "on the front lines in battling the USA PATRIOT Act", particularly the provisions that allow warrantless searches of library records. The act not only prohibits libraries from notifying the subjects of such searches, it also prohibits them from disclosing to the public whether any such searches have been made. In protest, West created a number of canary notices that libraries can post, which she suggests are "technically legal". One of them, for example, reads: "The FBI has not been here. Watch very closely for the removal of this sign." The Vermont Library Association provided copies of this sign to every public library in Vermont.

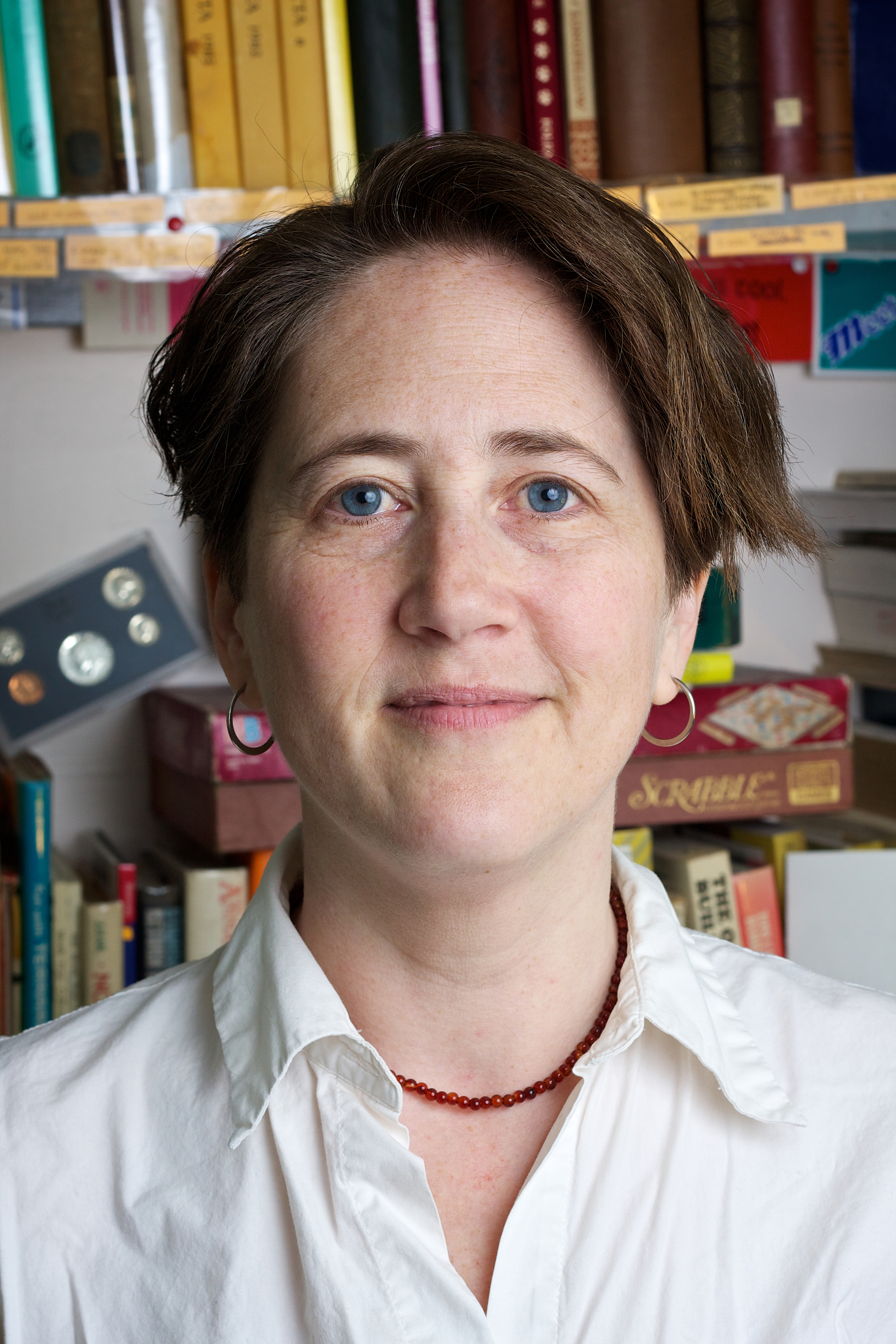
West in 2012

In September 2017, consumer credit reporting agency Equifax reported a cybersecurity breach affecting 145 million consumers. West, standing up for the individuals' right to digital privacy, sued Equifax in small claims court in Vermont. Her successful action was covered in the New York Times. West has outlined the steps she took in a Medium essay, "Suing Equifax in Small Claims Court". When notified that she had won her claim, West noted her intention was "the explicit mission of demonstrating that citizens are not powerless when it comes to their personal information."

In 2019, West's CNN Opinion essay, "Libraries are fighting to preserve your right to borrow e-books", drew wide attention for her stark assessment, "Librarians to publishers: Please take our money. Publishers to librarians: Drop dead." West analyzed the Macmillan decision at Information Today in an article, "Raw Deal in Ebook Pricing". West was interviewed by Jack Stewart at Marketplace and observed that this is an experiment that may not work out for Macmillan.

In 2022 Laughing Monk Brewing created a benefit beer named Sister Jessamyn dedicated to West for her "activism, work on the digital divide, and safe access to knowledge and free spaces." The Sister Jessamyn beer is made with Citra, Mosaic, and Cashmere. Partial proceeds go to SF Food Not Bombs.

== Published works ==
=== Books ===
- Jessamyn West (2011). Without a Net: Librarians Bridging the Digital Divide. Libraries Unlimited. ISBN 978-1-59884-453-5.
- Jessamyn West, ed. (2004). Digital Versus Non-Digital Reference: Ask a Librarian Online and Offline. Haworth Information Press. ISBN 978-0-7890-2442-8.
- K.R. Roberto; Jessamyn West, eds. (2003). Revolting Librarians Redux: Radical Librarians Speak Out. McFarland & Company. ISBN 978-0-7864-1608-0.

The book is a follow-up to the 1972 Revolting Librarians (ISBN 978-0-912932-01-9), and includes new essays by ten of the contributors to the original.

=== Chapters in books ===
- Jessamyn West (2025). "Independent Librarian". In Priscilla K. Shontz (ed.). Careers in Library and Information Services. Bloomsbury. ISBN 979-8-216-18575-8.
- Jessamyn West (2007). "Introduction: What Do Librarians Do All Day?". In Priscilla K. Shontz; Richard A. Murray (eds.). A Day in the Life: Career Options in Library and Information Science. Libraries Unlimited. ISBN 978-1-59158-364-6.
- Jessamyn West (2004). "You Want Me to Put What Where? Freelancing Librarianship as Job, Hobby and Passion". In Priscilla K. Shontz (ed.). The Librarian's Career Guidebook. Scarecrow Press. ISBN 978-0-8108-5034-7.

=== Articles ===
- West, Jessamyn (2020). "Working From Home? Try Connecting With Twitch!". Computers in Libraries. 40 (4): 12–13. ISSN 1041-7915.
- West, Jessamyn (April 2020). "A Little Something Extra". Computers in Libraries. 40 (3): 12–13. ISSN 1041-7915.
- West, Jessamyn (September 2019). "Raw Deal in Ebook Pricing". Information Today. 43 (5). ISSN 1041-7915.
- West, Jessamyn (December 2019). "Practical Technology". Computers in Libraries. 39 (10): 15–17. ISSN 1041-7915.
- West, Jessamyn (August 2, 2019). "Libraries are fighting to preserve your right to borrow e-books". CNN Opinion.
- West, Jessamyn (2018). "Data-Driven Discriminating Librarianship". Computers in Libraries. 38 (2): 14. ISSN 1041-7915.
- West, Jessamyn (December 2018). "Customize Everything From Gmail to Netflix". Computers in Libraries. 38 (10): 12–15. ISSN 1041-7915.
- West, Jessamyn. (May 2018). "Opening Up Research". Computers in Libraries 38 (4): 17–18.
- West, Jessamyn (April 5, 2007). "Saving Digital History". Library Journal: 2–6.

=== Writing on the Web ===
- abada abada (1997–)
- Librarian.net (1999–)
- Today in Librarian Tabs, (2016–2023), on the Medium platform.
- Wikipedia editor on many topics notably bios or library related stubs.
