= Tom West =

American computer hardware engineer

- West in 2009 at home in Westport, Massachusetts
- Born: Joseph Thomas West III; November 22, 1939; Bronxville, New York, U.S.
- Died: May 19, 2011 (aged 71); Westport, Massachusetts, U.S.
- Education: Amherst College, B.A. 1962
- Spouses: Elizabeth Cohon (m. 1965; div. 1994); Cindy Woodward (m. 2001; div. 2011)
- Children: 2, including Jessamyn West

Joseph Thomas West III (November 22, 1939 – May 19, 2011) was an American technologist. He is notable for being the protagonist in the Pulitzer Prize winning non-fiction book The Soul of a New Machine.

== Career ==
West began his career in computer design at RCA, after seven years at the Smithsonian Astrophysical Observatory, a job he received right out of college. He started working for Data General in 1974. He became the head of Data General's Eclipse group and then became the lead on the Eagle project, building a machine officially named the Eclipse MV/8000. After the publication of Soul of a New Machine, West was sent to Japan by Data General where he helped design DG-1, the first full-screen laptop. His last project in 1996, a thin Web server, was intended to be an internet-ready machine. West retired as Chief Technologist in 1998.

== Personal life ==
West was married to Elizabeth (Cohon) West in 1965; they divorced in 1994. The couple had two daughters, Katherine West and librarian Jessamyn West. West married Cindy Woodward (his former assistant at Data General) in 2001; the couple divorced in 2011. West died at the age of 71 in his Westport, Massachusetts, home of an apparent heart attack. His nephew, Christopher Schwarz, is a former editor of Popular Woodworking magazine, author of The Anarchist's Toolchest, and co-founder of Lost Art Press; West's death prompted Schwarz to "leave the magazine and do my own thing".
