= Edson de Castro =

American computer engineer (1938–2024)

Edson de Castro (September 14, 1938 – September 6, 2024) was an American computer engineer and businessman, best known for being a chief founder of Data General and for designing that company's Nova series of computers.

== Life and career ==
De Castro was born in Plainfield, New Jersey, on September 14, 1938. He was founder and CEO of Data General Corporation throughout the 1970s, the 1980s and into the 1990s when he was replaced by Ronald L Skates, a former Price Waterhouse Coopers partner. He also was the project manager in charge of developing the PDP-8 mini computer at Digital Equipment Corporation, before leaving to form Data General Corporation. As CEO of Data General, he appeared in Tracy Kidder's book The Soul of a New Machine.

De Castro married Jean DeCastro in Norwich, Connecticut, in 1963. Jean was a school teacher and Edson worked at Digital Equipment. They divorced in 1980. Edson de Castro died on September 6, 2024, at the age of 85.

== Books ==
- Kidder, Tracy (1981). The Soul of a New Machine. Boston: Little, Brown. ISBN 978-0-316-49170-9.
