= Popular Woodworking =

American woodworking magazine

- Editor in Chief: Logan Wittmer
- Frequency: Bimonthly
- Founded: 1985
- Company: Active Interest Media
- Country: United States
- Language: English
- Website: www.popularwoodworking.com

Popular Woodworking is a woodworking magazine published by Cruz Bay Publishing an arm of Active Interest Media.

== History and profile ==
The magazine's focus is a combination of hand tool and power tool woodworking including many how-to projects.

The magazine underwent many changes in ownership, most recently as a result of the bankruptcy of F+W Media where they got sold to Cruz Bay Publishing and Active Interest Media.

== Notable contributors ==
- Roy Underhill
- Christopher Schwarz
- Mary May
