= The Woodwright's Shop =

- Genre: How-to woodworking
- Created by: Roy Underhill
- Written by: Roy Underhill
- Directed by: Gary Hawkins; Geary Morton
- Presented by: Roy Underhill
- Theme music composer: The Lovin' Spoonful (1980-1988; seasons 1-8); Rod Abernethy (1989-2017; seasons 9-37)
- Opening theme: "Did You Ever Have to Make Up Your Mind?" (1980-1988; seasons 1-8) "Kildare's Fancy" (1989-2017; seasons 9-37)
- Ending theme: "Younger Girl" (1980-1988; seasons 1-8)
- Country of origin: United States
- Original language: English
- No. of seasons: 37
- No. of episodes: 468 (list of episodes)

Production
- Executive producers: Galen Black; Caroline Francis; Shannon Vickery
- Producers: Geary Morton; Roy Underhill
- Production locations: Eno River State Park, North Carolina; UNC-TV studios, Research Triangle Park, North Carolina
- Editor: Peter Olafson
- Running time: 30 minutes
- Production company: UNC-TV

Original release
- Network: UNC-TV
- Release: October 6, 1979 – September 19, 2017
- Network: PBS
- Release: October 3, 1980 – September 19, 2017

The Woodwright's Shop is an American half-hour woodworking television show hosted by master woodworker Roy Underhill which aired on the PBS network for 37 seasons (1980-2017). It is one of the longest-running how-to shows on PBS, with 468 half-hour episodes produced. The show debuted as a local program on October 6, 1979, before it went national on October 3, 1980. It was taped at the UNC-TV (University of North Carolina Center for Public Television) studios in Research Triangle Park, North Carolina.

== Overview ==
The Woodwright's Shop teaches the art of traditional woodworking using hand tools and human-powered machines. Viewers learn how to make furniture, toys, and other useful objects out of wood. Viewers also learn how to lay out wood projects and which tools to use for specific purposes. The show also teaches viewers how to use tools properly.

=== Wood joints ===
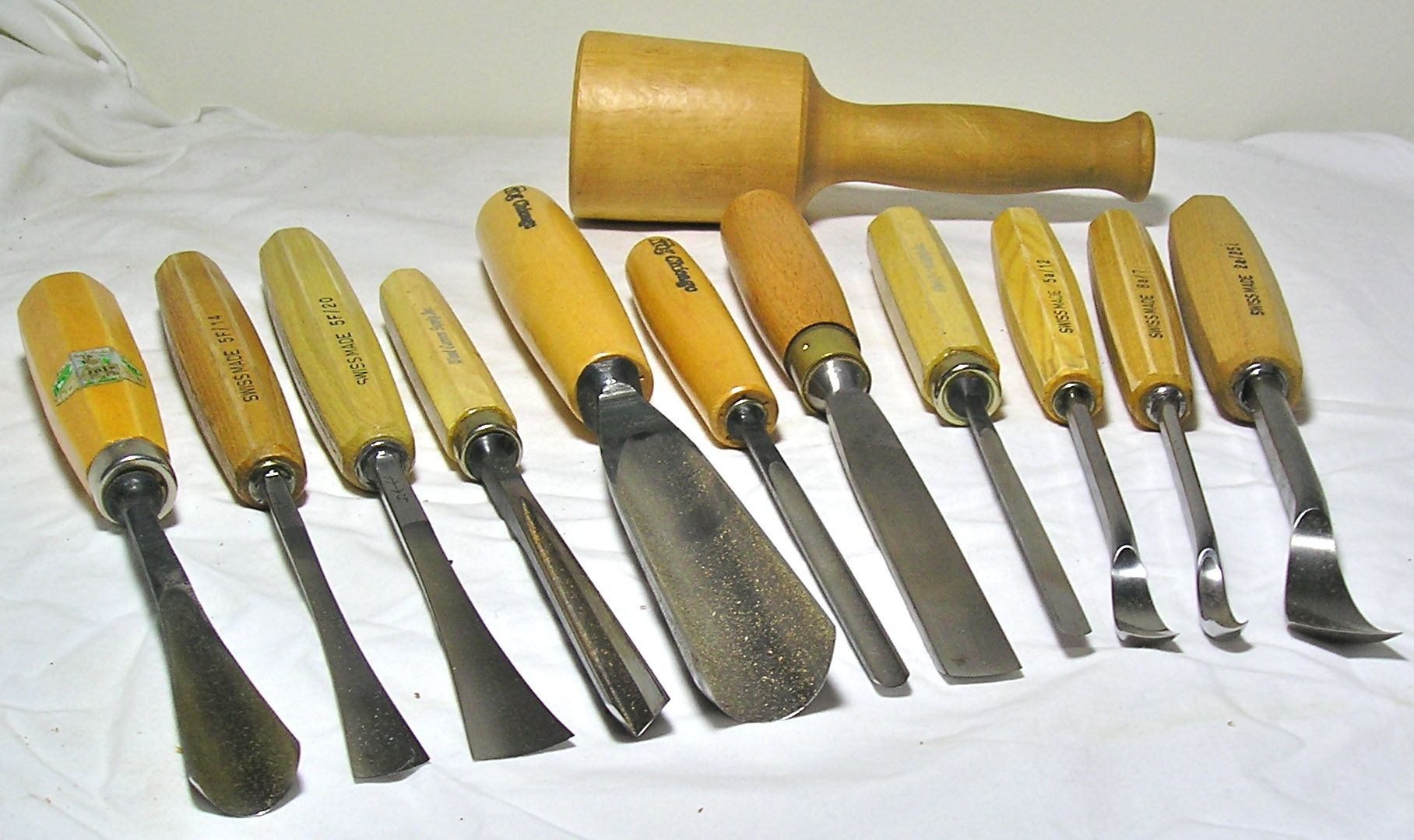
Various hand tools for carving wood

Underhill often showed viewers how to create wooden joints. Timber framing techniques are often used in conjunction with the wood joints described on the show. Hand tools are a major focus of the show. All of the hand tools used on the show are manually operated (i.e. non-electric). Proper handling and maintenance of tools is also part of the show. This includes the sharpening and sometimes making of tools, such as a scraper made from an old saw blade.

=== Machine tools ===
The most commonly used machine tool on the show is the lathe. Underhill typically used a treadle lathe, but also showed viewers how to build and operate a spring pole lathe. He also often used a gouge, in conjunction with his lathe, to remove material and smooth out a workpiece.

The show also featured the use of various jigs and appliances, for example the miter box. This is used to create square and perpendicular saw cuts, or to create saw cuts at a specific angle.

== Early history ==
The show started as an idea that Roy Underhill had in 1976. He built a workshop and historic museum in Durham, North Carolina, in the mid-1970s. He called it "The Woodwright's Shop" and started teaching classes on how to build things out of wood.

Underhill pitched the show idea to the PBS affiliate in Chapel Hill in 1978 but was rejected. He tried again in 1979 and filmed a pilot. Only in the fall of 1979 was the show accepted. 1979 was the same year that This Old House started airing on PBS. Underhill admits that he made up the term "woodwright" and that it is not an actual term. Initially, he was concerned about using the made-up term in the show's title, but decided to use it anyway. The show went on a brief hiatus in 1980 while Underhill was negotiating funding for the second season.

== Production ==
The show had a tight filming schedule. The show did not have a real script; instead, Underhill worked out the story he is going to present and how to do it. He decided where camera shots are needed and sets workpieces and tools in those locations. The filming of different shots was limited to three takes because of the limit of workpieces used on the show.

In the later years of the show, it was filmed in one take with no editing, and as a result the host was often out of breath by the end of the 24 minute program.

=== Injuries ===
The show also did not hide the nicks and cuts that come from woodworking with hand tools. The first such incident occurred in the third episode of the series, "Dumbheads in Action". A dumbhead is a clamping fixture on a foot-operated shaving horse used to hold unseasoned ("green") wood. The incident happened when he accidentally touched the cutting edge of the hewing hatchet he was using to produce the dumbhead, cutting his thumb in the process.

On one occasion, Roy seriously injured his hand with a hatchet. The scene was kept in the show because it was the last take of this particular scene. Underhill reviewed the take and felt that it gave the show some realism.

=== PBS funding ===
- State Farm (1984–2017)
- The Cooper Group (1982–1985)
- Corporation for Public Broadcasting (1991)
- Woodcraft (2002)

== Host ==
Roy Underhill in his shop

Roy Underhill was the host and creator of The Woodwright's Shop. He graduated from the University of North Carolina at Chapel Hill with a B.F.A. in theater direction. Roy went to Duke University for environmental studies in the mid-1970s. For his thesis, he did a live presentation titled "How to start with a tree and an axe and build your house and everything in it." Somebody told him "You ought to do that on TV", when he was finished with his presentation.

He went on to work at Colonial Williamsburg as a carpenter, building houses the way they were built in the 18th century. During this same time, he also started producing The Woodwright's Shop television show for PBS. For 10 years, Underhill was a master housewright for Colonial Williamsburg. He helped with program development for another five years before he left over a disagreement about the authenticity of slave quarters on the project.

Roy has written several books on woodworking, most of which have been published by the University of North Carolina Press. Some of the books include, The Woodwright's Shop: A Practical Guide to Traditional Woodcraft (ISBN 0-8078-4082-3) and The Woodwright's Guide: Working Wood with Wedge and Edge (ISBN 0-8078-5914-1).

Roy lent his woodworking expertise to the 2005 movie The New World about the founding of the settlement in Jamestown, Virginia, in the 17th century. He also taught actor Colin Farrell about woodworking for the film and acted as an extra in the movie.

== Guests ==
Roy had a wide range of woodworking professionals as guests on his show from many different fields of woodworking; Frank Klausz, Christopher Schwarz, Nora Hall, Steve Latta, David Calvo, Michael Dunbar, Dan Mack, Don Weber, Wayne Barton and Curtis Buchanan as well as many lesser-known specialists in the fields of tinsmithing, spoon carving, cooperage (barrels, buckets, canteens), lutherie (stringed instruments), whirligigs, archery, puppetry, basket making, spinning wheels and blacksmithing. Guests have also included famous people with a woodworking hobby, such as Governor Mike Easley. Roy's wife and children appeared on various episodes over the show's thirty-plus-year span of production.

== Episodes ==
Each season of The Woodwright's Shop consists of 13 episodes broadcast during the last 13 weeks of the year, typically starting at the beginning of October.

=== Video release ===
The show was first released on VHS tapes in 1993. All of the shows are also available on DVD.
