= Henry O. Studley =

American woodworker

Studley Tool Chest, open

Henry O. Studley (1838–1925) was an organ and piano maker, carpenter, stonemason, and Freemason who worked for the Smith Organ Co. and later for the Poole Piano Company of Quincy, Massachusetts. Born in Lowell, Massachusetts, Studley is best known for creating the so-called Studley Tool Chest, a wall hanging tool chest that holds 218 tools in a space that takes up about 40 by 20 inches (102 × 51 cm) of wall space when closed. Studley joined the Massachusetts Infantry at the start of the Civil War and was captured in Galveston, Texas in 1863. After the war, he returned to Quincy and joined the Rural Masonic Lodge. He died in 1925 and was remembered in his obituary in the Quincy Patriot-Ledger for his tool chest, among his other achievements.

== The Studley Tool Chest ==
Studley bequeathed the tool chest to a friend. That man's grandson, Peter Hardwick, loaned the chest to the Smithsonian in the late 1980s as part of an exhibit at the Smithsonian Institution's National Museum of American History, until it was purchased by a private collector for an undisclosed amount of money. The current owner continues to lend the chest to the Smithsonian and other venues; on occasion. It has been featured on an episode of The New Yankee Workshop and is the subject of a May 1993 article in Taunton's Fine Woodworking and a popular wall poster.

When closed and hanging on a wall it takes up an area of approximately 39 inches by 20 inches with a 9 inch depth. It opens to become a 40-inch by 40-inch tool chest. It is made out of mahogany, rosewood, walnut, ebony, ivory and mother of pearl, materials that were probably taken from the Poole Piano Company's scrap material. The fine craftsmanship is exhibited by the way each tool fits snugly into its space, often with an audible click as the tool snaps into its close-fit cavity. Sections of the chest swing out to allow access to a second or third layer of tools. The tool chest features Masonic symbolism, including the Square and Compasses emblem and Royal Arch symbols.

== See also ==
- Toolbox
