= Christopher Schwarz =

American woodworker, author, and publisher

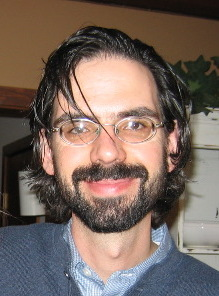
- Schwarz in 2004
- Born: June 13, 1968 (age 58); St. Louis, Missouri, U.S.
- Occupations: Woodworker, author, publisher
- Known for: Writing about woodworking, author, publisher.
- Spouse: Lucy May
- Children: 2
- Website: christophermschwarz.com

Christopher Martin Schwarz (born June 13, 1968) is an American woodworker, author, and publisher. He established the Lost Art Press in 2007 in Covington, Kentucky.

== Career ==
Christopher Schwarz was born in St. Louis, Missouri to Paul and Terry (West) Schwarz and raised on a homestead farm in Haskell, Arkansas. He earned a B.S. in journalism at the Medill School of Journalism at Northwestern University and a M.S. in journalism at Ohio State University in 1993.

Schwarz moved to Lexington, Kentucky to cover state government and began to study woodworking at night. In 1996 he moved to Fort Mitchell, Kentucky and became managing editor of the journal, Popular Woodworking. He later became the editor and wrote several books under the Popular Woodworking imprint including Build a Sawbench: With Christopher Schwarz, Classic American Furniture, and Workbenches: From Design & Theory to Construction & Use.

In 2007 Schwarz and John Hoffman established the Lost Art Press in Covington, Kentucky to publish books and videos for hand tool collectors and woodworkers. Volumes produced include The Stick Chair Book, The Anarchist's Design Book, and Ingenious Mechanicks: Early Workbenches & Workholding. He left Popular Woodworking in 2011 to focus on Lost Art Press and his own woodworking business full time, prompted by the death of his uncle Tom West.

In an interview at FineWoodworking Schwarz was characterized as the most published woodworker of all time. He lives in Covington, Kentucky with his wife WVXU's 'Cincinnati Edition' host Lucy May. They have two daughters.

== Bibliography ==
- Schwarz, Christopher and F W Media (Firm) dirs. 2010. Build a Sawbench: With Christopher Schwarz. F W Media. ISBN 9781440312984
- Schwarz, Christopher. 2014. Classic American Furniture. Cincinnati Ohio: Popular Woodworking Books. ISBN 9781440337437
- Schwarz, Christopher. 2016. Workbenches : From Design & Theory to Construction & Use Revised and updated ed. Cincinnati: Popular Woodworking. ISBN 9781440343124
- Schwarz, Christopher Megan Fitzpatrick and Nicholas Moegly. 2018. Ingenious Mechanicks: Early Workbenches & Workholding First ed. Fort Mitchell KY: Lost Art Press. ISBN 9780997870275
- Schwarz, Christopher and Briony Morrow-Cribbs. 2019. The Anarchist's Design Book Expanded ed. Covington KY USA: Lost Art Press LLC. ISBN 9781733391610
- Schwarz, Christopher. 2021. The Stick Chair Book Covington KY: Lost Art Press. ISBN 9781954697034
