= Wainscot chair =

Type of wooden panel-backed chair

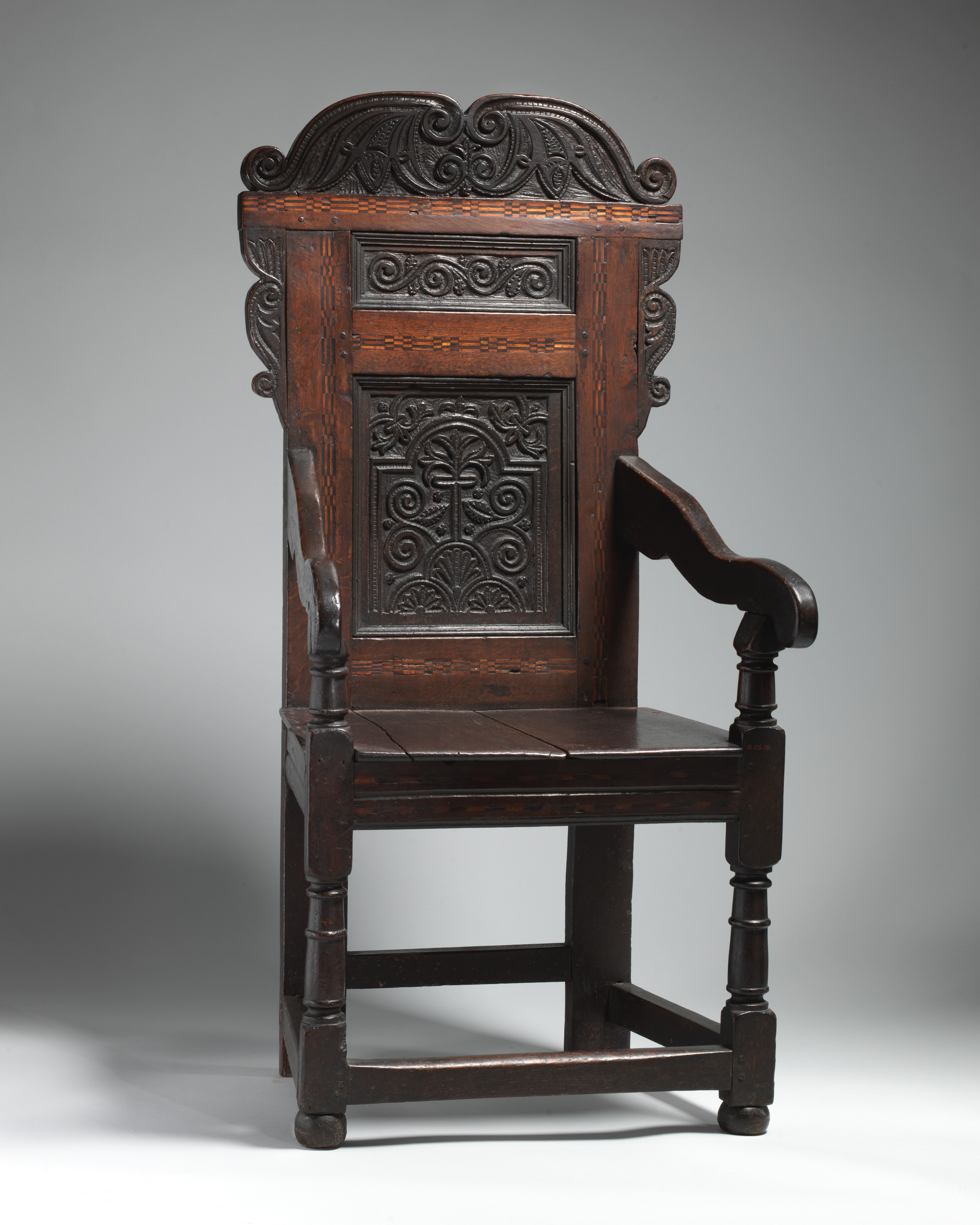
A wainscot chair, English, c. 1600

A wainscot chair is a type of chair which was common in early 17th-century England and colonial America. Usually made of oak, the term can be used in a general way for a simple heavy chair, or more specifically for a particular style of heavy panel-backed chair as detailed later. The name derives from the fine grade of oak which was used at the time for wainscot panelling.

== Details ==
When used in a specific sense, there are many characteristics that are implied. These include:

- the front legs having been shaped on a lathe
- the back legs being square-sectioned
- having arm supports
- lacking an upholstered seat
- a panel back, sometimes rather plain but often carved with a relatively complex design
