= Roy Underhill =

American woodworker

- Born: Roy Underhill; December 22, 1950 (age 75); Washington, DC, U.S.
- Occupations: Carpenter; Woodworking Instructor; Television Host; Author
- Children: Eleanor Underhill; Rachell Underhill

Roy Underhill (born December 22, 1950) is an American woodworker and television show host. Born and raised in Washington, D.C., he was the first master housewright at the Colonial Williamsburg reconstruction. From 1980 to 2017, he was the creator and host of the PBS series The Woodwright's Shop.

Underhill was introduced to traditional woodworking by a sister who worked at the Smithsonian Institution. He attended the University of North Carolina at Chapel Hill and earned a degree in theater. In the early 1970s, Underhill and his wife moved to Colorado to pursue a career in acting. When that failed, the Underhills moved to a remote area of New Mexico where traditional woodworking was one of the few means of survival.

In the late 1970s, Underhill moved back to North Carolina and Duke University, pursuing a multi-disciplinary course of study including engineering, forestry, and history and was subsequently awarded a Master of Forestry in 1977. At the birth of his first daughter, he approached the UNC Center for Public Television with an idea about a traditional woodworking show. Initially rejected, the idea was finally accepted; in 1979, filming began on The Woodwright's Shop at West Point on the Eno in Durham, N.C. Around the same time, he also took the job as master housewright and later director of interpretive development at Colonial Williamsburg in Virginia. The Woodwright's Shop would subsequently be filmed at the UNC-TV studios in Research Triangle Park, North Carolina, with some episodes filmed on location in various places.

More recently, Underhill also works as a communications consultant. He is the author of several books, including The Woodwright's Eclectic Workshop and Woodwright's Shop: A Practical Guide to Traditional Woodcraft. In 2011 he gave a presentation at TEDx Raleigh, sharing the value of ingenuity and living in the present.

Underhill was teaching traditional woodworking in a classroom environment he called "The Woodwright's School" in Pittsboro, NC until August 2023. The Woodwright's School website is still active, but the school is permanently closed and the building now houses another business.

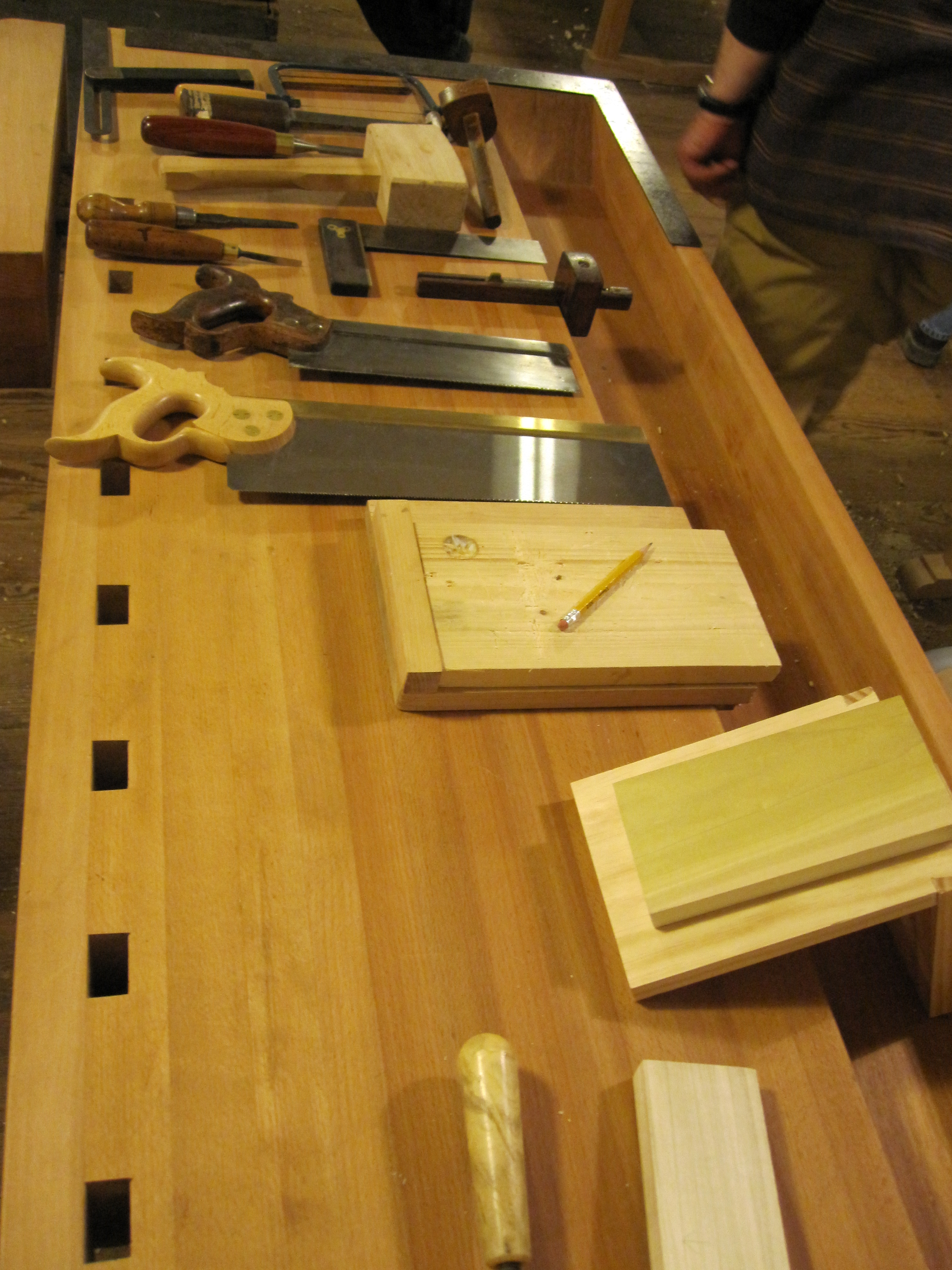
A workbench at The Woodwright's School, 2010

Many hand tool aficionados hold Underhill in extremely high regard and may refer to him with the shorthand "St. Roy."

== Publications ==
- Underhill, Roy (1981). The Woodwright's Shop: A Practical Guide to Traditional Woodcraft. UNC Press. ISBN 0-8078-4082-3.
- Underhill, Roy (1983). The Woodwright's Companion: Exploring Traditional Woodcraft. UNC Press. ISBN 0-8078-4095-5.
- Underhill, Roy (1986). The Woodwright's Workbook: Further Explorations in Traditional Woodcraft. UNC Press. ISBN 0-8078-4157-9.
- Mullins, Lisa C.; Roy Underhill (1988). Styles of the Emerging Nation (Architectural Treasures of Early America, 13. Historical Times. ISBN 0-918678-35-8.
- Underhill, Roy (1991). The Woodwright's Eclectic Workshop. UNC Press. ISBN 0-8078-4347-4.
- Underhill, Roy (1996). The Woodwright's Apprentice:Twenty Favorite Projects from The Woodwright's Shop. UNC Press. ISBN 0-8078-4612-0.
- Underhill, Roy (2000). Khrushchev's Shoe and Other Ways to Captivate an Audience of 1 to 1,000. Perseus Publishing. ISBN 0-7382-0672-5.
- Underhill, Roy (2008). The Woodwright's Guide: Working Wood with Wedge and Edge. UNC Press. ISBN 978-0-8078-5914-8.
- Underhill, Roy (2014). Calvin Cobb: Radio Woodworker!. Lost Art Press. ISBN 978-0-9906230-2-1.
