= Lost Art Press =

Publisher of books and videos for woodworkers

- Founded: 2007
- Founders: Christopher Schwarz and John Hoffman
- Country of origin: United States
- Headquarters location: Covington, Kentucky, Kentucky
- Key people: Megan Fitzpatrick (editor); Christopher Schwarz (publisher)
- Publication types: Magazines, Books
- Nonfiction topics: Woodworking, Hand tools
- Official website: lostartpress.com

Lost Art Press is a publisher of books and videos for woodworkers and hand tool collectors and is based in Covington, Kentucky. It was established in 2007 by Christopher Schwarz and John Hoffman.

The company has published books by modern woodworkers such as Nancy Hiller and George R. Walker as well as republishing older manuscripts by woodworkers such as André Jacob Roubo. They also produce books about woodworkers such as Henry O. Studley and Charles H. Hayward. All of their fifty-eight titles are printed in the United States; they do not sell their titles through mass-market retailers or websites.

== Values ==
The company publishes works that help the modern woodworker learn traditional hand-tool skills. They attempt to restore the balance between hand and machine work by unearthing the so-called "lost arts" of hand skills. Also, they explain how they can be integrated with the machinery in the modern shop to help produce furniture that is crisp, well-proportioned, stout and quickly made. Make Magazine has said they tap into the "growing unplugged workshop momentum."

"The Anarchist's Tool Chest," written by Christopher Schwarz, describes a world where woodworking tools are at the center of an ethical life filled with creating furniture that will last for generations. Schwarz posits that people can build almost anything with a kit of fewer than 50 good tools; the book shows the reader how to select real working tools, and provides instruction for building a proper chest for a toolkit, following the ancient rules that have been forgotten or ignored. The "anarchism" mentioned in the title is individualist anarchism, specifically "aesthetic anarchism".

== Awards ==
Lost Art Press won Covington's Authenti-CITY award in 2022, being called "a mecca that puts Covington on the map for the hand-tool woodworking crowd." The deluxe editions of their two books on Roubo were each named one of the "50 Books of the Year" by the Design Observer, in association with the AIGA and Designers & Books in 2013 and 2017.
