= Vermont Library Association =

Professional association for librarians in Vermont

- Nickname: VLA
- Formation: 1893
- Tax ID no.: 81-4640258
- Parent organization: American Library Association
- Website: vermontlibraries.org

The Vermont Library Association (VLA) is a professional organization for librarians and library workers in the state of Vermont. It was founded in 1893 and is headquartered in Burlington, Vermont. VLA has approximately 400 members including public, academic, special, and school librarians, library trustees, and library friends. VLA co-sponsors an annual conference in May with the Vermont School Library Association and publishes a bi-monthly newsletter VLA News.

== See also ==
- List of libraries in the United States
