= The Soul of a New Machine =

1981 nonfiction book by Tracy Kidder

- The Soul of a New Machine
- Author: Tracy Kidder
- Language: English
- Subject: Computer engineering
- Publisher: Little, Brown and Company
- Publication date: July 1981
- Publication place: United States
- Media type: Hardcover
- Pages: 293 pp
- ISBN: 978-0-316-49170-9
- OCLC: 7551785
- Dewey Decimal: 621.3819/582 19
- LC Class: TK7885.4 .K53

The Soul of a New Machine is a nonfiction book written by Tracy Kidder and published in 1981. It chronicles the experiences of a computer engineering team racing to design a next-generation computer at a blistering pace under tremendous pressure. The machine was launched in 1980 as the Data General Eclipse MV/8000.

The book, whose author was described by the New York Times as having "elevated it to a high level of narrative art" is "about real people working on a real computer for a real company," and it won the 1982 National Book Award for Nonfiction and a Pulitzer Prize for General Nonfiction.

== Synopsis ==
The book opens with a turf war between two computer design groups within Data General Corporation, a minicomputer vendor in the 1970s. Most of the senior designers are assigned the "sexy" job of designing the next-generation machine in North Carolina. Their project, code-named "Fountainhead", is to give Data General a machine to compete with the VAX computer from Digital Equipment Corporation (DEC), which is starting to take over the new 32-bit minicomputer market. Meanwhile, at the corporate headquarters at Westborough, Massachusetts, the few remaining senior designers there are assigned the much more humble job of improving Data General's existing products. Tom West, the leader of the Westborough designers, starts a skunkworks project. Code-named "Eagle", it becomes a backup plan in case Fountainhead fails, and then the company's only hope in catching up with DEC. In order to complete the project on time, West takes risks: he elects to use new technology, and he relies on new college graduates (who have never designed anything so complex) as the bulk of his design team. The book follows many of the designers as they give almost every waking moment of their lives to design and debug the new machine.

== Themes ==
The work environment described in the book is in many ways opposite of traditional management. Instead of top-down management, many of the innovations are started at the grassroots level. Instead of management having to coerce labor to work harder, labor volunteers to complete the project on time. The reason for this is that people will give their best when the work itself is challenging and rewarding. Many of the engineers state that "they don't work for the money", meaning they work for the challenge of inventing and creating. The motivational system is akin to the game of pinball, the analogy being that if you win this round, you get to play the game again; that is, build the next generation of computers.

A running theme in the book is the tension between engineering quality and time to market: the engineers, challenged to bring a minicomputer to market on a very short time-frame, are encouraged to cut corners on design. Tom West describes his motto as "Not everything worth doing is worth doing well," or "If you can do a quick-and-dirty job and it works, do it."

The engineers, in turn, complain that the team's goal is to "put a bag on the side of the Eclipse" – in other words, to turn out an inferior product in order to have it completed more quickly.

Tom West practices the "Mushroom Theory of Management" – "keeping them in the dark, feeding them shit, and watch them grow." That is, isolating the design team from outside influences and, instead, using the fear of the unknown to motivate the team.

The “soul” of a new machine is another theme explored throughout the book. The book illustrates soul by describing dedicated engineers who make real a new machine through hours of attentive labor.
