= Legato (disambiguation) =

Legato is a musical articulation which indicates that notes are to be played smoothly.

Legato may also refer to:

- Papal Legate, a representative of the Pope abroad
- Lesbian and Gay Inter-University Organization, LEGATO, an LGBT organization in Turkey aimed at university students
- EMC Legato NetWorker, a backup software from EMC Corporation
- Legato Systems, a computer software storage company taken over in 2003 by EMC Corporation
- Legato Bluesummers, a character in the anime and manga series Trigun
- Legato (company), Israeli artificial intelligence software company founded in 2025
