= Virtual Computing Environment =

American computer hardware brand

Virtual Computing Environment Company
- Type: Division
- Industry: cloud platforms
- Founded: 2009; 2011 (as VCE)
- Defunct: January 2016
- Fate: Acquired by EMC, which was later acquired by Dell Technologies
- Key people: Chad Sakac (President); Trey Layton (CTO)
- Products: Vblock, VxBlock, VxRack, VxRail
- Parent: EMC Corporation
- Website: www.vce.com

Virtual Computing Environment Company (VCE) was a division of EMC Corporation that manufactured converged infrastructure appliances for enterprise environments. Founded in 2009 under the name Acadia, it was originally a joint venture between EMC and Cisco Systems, with additional investments by Intel and EMC subsidiary VMware. EMC acquired a 90% controlling stake in VCE from Cisco in October 2014, giving it majority ownership. VCE ended in 2016 after an internal division realignment, followed by the sale of EMC to Dell.

== History ==
Cisco Systems, EMC Corporation and VMware (partially owned by EMC) unveiled a joint partnership in November 2009 to develop cloud computing platforms called Vblock Infrastructure Packages. The partnership was originally called the VMware-Cisco-EMC alliance, though the name was later shortened to VCE, for the “Virtual Computing Environment coalition”.

At the same EMC World trade show, Cisco and EMC introduced a joint venture named Acadia. The goal of Acadia, originally set up as a separate legal entity, was to build Vblock Infrastructure Packages in a standardized and repeatable fashion for customer data centers. Michael Capellas, who also was a board member of Cisco, was named chairman of Acadia, and its first chief executive officer (CEO) in May 2010. Sales initially encountered some confusion among customers (which often had different staffs for storage and networking, for example), and different fiscal quarter sales cycles. By the end of 2010, Capellas told analysts the venture had 65 customers, with an average system costing about $2.5 million.

Acadia and the Virtual Computing Environment coalition combined into a single entity in January 2011, called VCE, the Virtual Computing Environment Company. Originally located in Silicon Valley and Dallas, Texas, an expansion was announced in March 2011 to Richardson, Texas with an investment from the Texas Enterprise Fund. In October 2011, another office opened in Marlboro, Massachusetts, close to VCE's EMC-owned manufacturing plant in Franklin, Massachusetts. In July 2012, Cisco executive Praveen Akkiraju was appointed CEO and Frank Hauck as president. It was estimated VCE had 1200 employees at the time, with undisclosed revenues but accumulated losses. Publicized customers included Babson College and the Mississippi Community College Board. The press debated if the venture should be considered a "startup company", with one headline joking "VCE = virtual cash erosion" and questioning millions of dollars of executive compensation. Others considered the arrangement to be a wise investment.

Through 2012, there was a mixture of some success (with speculation of layoffs), and continued confusion due to products from competing partners such as NetApp FlexPod and Xsigo Systems. Cisco had announced its own "framework" called CloudVerse in late 2011 that was not specific to VMware. In August 2012, EMC announced a VSPEX reference architecture and partnership with Lenovo and other distributors that was seen as competing with a lower-cost option.

In a November 2012 report by Gartner, VCE had a 57.4% share of integrated infrastructure systems in the second quarter of 2012 based on revenue. Gartner had previously tracked server, networking, and external controller-based storage as individual markets. VCE was named one of the “2013 Virtualization 50” by CRN Magazine. In May 2013, VCE estimated a $1 billion annual sales rate with more than 1,000 Vblock Systems sold. However, in US Securities and Exchange Commission filings, EMC accounted for a cumulative loss of over $430 million by September 2012, and Cisco a loss of $457 million by early 2013, since revenues are recorded to the owning companies, not VCE itself. EMC reported an investment of $667.2 million in cash and $13.2 million in stock-based compensation to VCE, for a stake of about 58%. Cisco reported a gross investment of $457 million, for a stake of about 35%.

By 2013, some of the same press writers that initially criticized VCE came to view the structure of VCE as being good business for investors. Other press highlighted VCE as a source of innovation and financial performance for investors. Total VCE for 2013 has been reported at over $1B with over a 50% year-over-year growth rate.

In October 2014, EMC announced that it had acquired majority control of the VCE venture, with Cisco maintaining a 10% stake.

In January 2016, EMC announced that VCE had become the Converged Platform Division of EMC with Chad Sakac as President.

On September 7, 2016, EMC was acquired by Dell. The Converged Platform Division of EMC is currently known as the Converged Platform and Solutions Division of Dell EMC.

By February 2018, Dell EMC announced VxBlock System 1000 as a perpetual architecture and the Dell Technologies converged systems business achieved $6.51B USD of market sales during 2020 according to International Data Group.

== Products and services ==
VCE marketed converged infrastructure servers known as vBlocks, which combine VMware vSphere software running on Cisco Unified Computing Systems (UCS) connected with Cisco Nexus switches, attached to EMC Symmetrix storage. Despite the "block" in the name, the storage can be accessed as either a block device or a file server.

Vblock Systems are marketed for large-scale datacenters which run software applications such as Microsoft Exchange Server, Microsoft SharePoint or SAP ERP. They are delivered in standard 19-inch rack units to aid in planning for cooling and power requirements.

The company initially manufactured converged datacenter units known as Vblock, which incorporate Cisco servers and networking hardware, EMC storage systems, and VMware for virtualization.

Later, VxBlock was added providing the ability for customers to run VMware NSX.

In 2015, VxRack and in 2016 VxRail were added as separate products.

=== Original systems ===
In 2009, the Virtual Computing Environment coalition announced three models of Vblock Infrastructure Packages. Vblock 2, intended for high-end data centers, was designed to support 3,000 to 6,000 virtual machines using Cisco UCS, Cisco Nexus 1000v and multilayer director switches (MDS), as well as EMC Symmetrix VMAX storage and VMware vSphere software. Vblock 1, intended for the midmarket, was designed for 800 to 3,000 virtual machines and had had a similar configuration to the Vblock 2, but with EMC Clariion storage rather than EMC Symmetrix VMAX. Vblock 0, the intended low-end configuration, was projected for release in 2010 to support 300 to 800 virtual machines and use a similar configuration, but with EMC Celerrastorage. The term "infrastructure package" was later changed to "infrastructure platform" and then just "Vblock System".

=== Vblock ===
Vblock is the brand name VCE uses for racks containing the components of its data center products. Prepackaging, called converged infrastructure, allows customers to select preconfigured and integrated solutions, with predictable units of power, weight, cooling, and geometry for data center planning purposes.

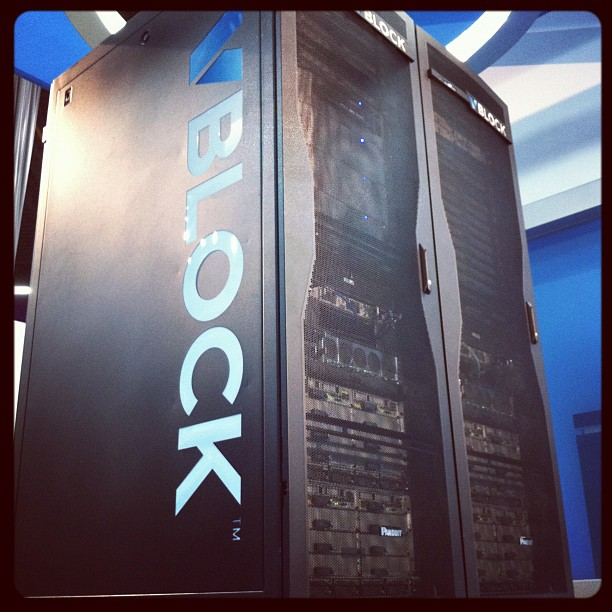
Vblock 300 FX at VCE (company) booth during CA World 2011.

Vblock systems consist of storage and provisioning from EMC, switches and servers from Cisco, and VMware virtualization software running on the servers. In addition, Vblock system customers' support calls are handled by VCE.

Vblock had two series based on the following compositional elements:

- EMC provides storage and provisioning
  - VNX
  - VMAX
  - Ionix UIM/P
- Cisco provides compute and networking
  - UCS
  - Nexus
- VMware provides virtualization
  - vSphere
  - with vDS provided via Cisco Nexus 1000V
  - with MPIO provided via EMC PowerPath/VE

Vblock brand naming changed since its inception. In 2009, the term Vblock Infrastructure Packages was announced by then Acadia (technical partnership), the Virtual Computing Environment coalition, as well as their primary investors. In late 2010 and continuing through 2011, the term Packages was replaced with Platforms. By mid-2012, the term, Infrastructure Platforms was replaced with Systems in wider circulation to arrive at, simply, Vblock™ Systems. Meanwhile, constituent elements and technology included upgrades to the product lines from Cisco, EMC, and VMware.

==== Infrastructure Packages ====
Originally, these combined a reference architecture with a physical and logical configuration step initially at a customer data center or colocation data center and later within a pre-manufacturing environment for shipment to a customer data center or colocation data center. Options were limited during the time these were marketed and sold.

==== Series ====
- 300: In contrast to the 0, 1, 1U later series were produced in manufacturing centers and then installed within a customer data center or colocation data center by a VCE partner or professional services team.

Models were named EX, FX, GX and HX, and later 320, 340, and 350.

- 500:The EMC XtremIO based model
- 700: This series offers an even larger number of options. Models were named LX and MX, and later 720 and 740.

==== Customers ====
No confirmed numbers were announced publicly by VCE or its investors until 2013 but when it was disclosed the numbers were provided conservatively as being over 800 customers in almost 60 countries with nearly 2000 VCE manufactured Vblock Systems sold. Because of the lack of a manufactured physical and logical build on an actual VCE manufacturing floor, previous deployments in 2009 and early 2010 of what were called or referred to as Vblock (often with various use of upper and lower case spelling) are not considered to be Vblock by some pundits and infrastructure professionals since these so-called reference architectures varied greatly from project to project when compared to late 2010 manufactured Vblock. Anecdotally, institutions and companies using Vblock have been involved in published testimonials.

=== Enterprise-level systems ===
In May 2011, the Vblock System Series 300 was announced with models EX, FX, GX and HX (smallest to largest). The Vblock 2 was renamed the 700 series.

The Vblock System 700 LX was announced at the EMC World May 2012 trade show, as the most expensive Vblock System, supporting thousands of virtual machines. VCE introduced the inclusion of EMC software for backup, recovery, replication, business continuity and data mobility for virtualized environments. Applications included EMC Avamar, EMC Data Domain, and EMC RecoverPoint. The Vblock System 700 included EMC VPLEX workload mobility and business continuity software, as well as support for new features in EMC Unified Infrastructure Manager, improved VMware integration, and centralized monitoring of multiple Vblock Systems.

In February 2013, VCE announced Vblock 300 and Vblock 700 models with increased performance and data throughput, using upgraded server and storage components.

=== Midmarket and entry level systems ===
In 2013 VCE announced products for the midrange and remote branch office market. These models included the Vblock System 100 and Vblock System 200.

The Vblock 100 was designed to host up to 200 virtual machines in a 24U or 42U rack mount space with up to eight Cisco C220 M3 blade servers, two Cisco Catalyst 3750-X switches and up to 8 TB of storage capacity on an EMC VNXe3150 or VNXe3300 array. The Vblock 200 comes configured with up to 12 Cisco servers, two Nexus 5548UP unified Ethernet and SAN switches, a Cisco Catalyst 3750 management switch, and up to 105 hard drives via the included VNX 5300 array.

=== Specialized systems ===
VCE introduced a specialized system for SAP HANA in February 2013. It combined a Vblock System with SAP HANA in-memory computing and database application software. Later in September 2013 VCE introduced specialized system for high performance database for Oracle as well as extreme applications for both VMware and Citrix VDI environments.

=== Hyperconverged systems ===
Dell introduced a hyperconverged system at EMC World 2015 in February 2015. The first model is the VxRack 1032 based on EMC ScaleIO software defined storage. The second model was announced at VMware World in September 2015, called the VxRack 1034 based around VMware VSAN. Both models use commodity hardware (rumoured to be sourced from Quanta) with an attached local disk presented via ScaleIO or VSAN software.

=== Software ===
Desktop virtualization management software that uses VMware View called FastPath was announced in August 2011, and upgraded in June 2012.

In February 2013, VCE announced the management software application Vision Intelligent Operations Software. VCE Vision software enables a single management pane for the components in the Vblock Systems it manages via plugins for third party management, automation, and orchestration tools from VMware, Cisco, BMC, CA, and others via RESTful API, SNMP, and unified logging.

== Services ==
VCE provides services through partners to plan, design, and deploy Vblock Systems.
