= Uffa =

Uffa or UFFA may refer to:

- Uffa or Wuffa of East Anglia, 6th-century king of East Anglia
- Uffa Fox (1898–1972), English boat designer and sailing enthusiast
- UFFA, anarchist youth house in Trondheim, Norway
- UFFA (Uganda), Uganda Freight Forwarders Association, formed in 2001
- UFFA, acronym in the Knowledge-Centered Support (KCS) methodology that stands for Use It, Flag It, Fix It, Add It

== See also ==
- Uffà! Uffà!, 1980 album by Italian singer-songwriter Edoardo Bennato
