= Infra =

Infra may refer to:

- Infra, a shortening of infrastructure commonly used in business or tech contexts
- Infra-, an English language prefix
- Infra, a Latin legal term
- Infra, a term used to cite subsequent material in academic sources; see Citation signal § Internal cross-references
- Infra (album), 2010, by Max Richter
- Infra (video game), 2016 adventure video game by Loiste Interactive
- Infra Corporation, an American software company
- Infraware, an American software company
