= RecoverPoint =

RecoverPoint is a continuous data protection product offered by Dell EMC which supports asynchronous and synchronous data replication of block-based storage. RecoverPoint was originally created by a company called Kashya, which was bought by EMC in 2006.

== Description ==
Kashya was founded in February, 2001, originally located in Ramat Gan, Israel. Venture funding included Battery Ventures and Jerusalem Global Ventures. In 2003, additional operations in San Jose, California were announced along with $12 million in funding and a first product. Kashya was acquired by EMC Corporation on May 9, 2006, for $153 million. EMC had already announced a product named RecoverPoint in October 2005, adapted from a product called Recovery One from Mendocino Software. The Kashya product had been named KDX 5000. The EMC RecoverPoint product based on Kashya technology was released in 2007, and version 3.0 released in 2008.

RecoverPoint continuous data protection (CDP) tracks changes to data at a block level and journals these changes. Every write is tracked and stored as a different snapshot. Alternatively, groups of writes can be aggregated according to configuration in order to reduce storage space and network traffic. The journal then allows rolling data to a previous "Point-In-Time" in order to view the drive contents as they were before a certain data corruption. CDP can journal each write individually, hence enabling any-point-in-time snapshots, or it can be configured to combine consecutive writes in order to reduce journal space and improve bandwidth. CDP works only over a storage area network - the RecoverPoint appliances need to be configured for the replica and the journal Logical Unit Numbers (LUNs).

RecoverPoint continuous remote replication (CRR) enables a replica in a remote site. For such a setup, RecoverPoint appliances clusters are required in both the local and remote sites. These 2 clusters communicate over either Fibre Channel (FC) or Internet Protocol. RecoverPoint applies data compression and data de-duplication in order to reduce wide area network traffic. As of RecoverPoint 3.4, only one remote site. CRR can be combined with CDP in order to provide concurrent local and remote (CLR) replication.

The consistency group (CG) term is used for grouping several LUNs together in order to ensure write-order consistency over several volumes. This is used for example with a database that stores its data and journal on different logical drives. These logical drives must be kept in-sync on the replica if data-consistency needs to be preserved. Other examples are multi-volume file systems such as ZFS or Windows' Dynamic Disks.

Similar to other continuous data protection products, and unlike backup products, RecoverPoint needs to obtain a copy of every write in order to track data changes. EMC advertises RecoverPoint as heterogenous due to its support of multi-vendor server, network and storage arrays.

Host-based write splitting is done using a device driver that is installed on the server accessing the storage volumes. The usage of a host-based splitter allows replication of selected non-EMC storage. Available fabric-based splitters are for Brocade Communications Systems SAN switches and for Cisco Systems SANTap. This requires the investment in additional switch blades. This configuration allows splitting from all operating systems regardless of their version, and is agnostic to the storage array vendor.

Storage array splitters are only supported on a subset of EMC storage products. This method allows write splitting from all operating systems, and does not require special SAN switching hardware. The RecoverPoint/SE is a slimmed-down version that only supports this type of splitter.

Each site requires installation of a cluster that is composed of 2-8 RecoverPoint appliances. The multiple appliances work together as a high availability cluster. Each appliance is connected via FC to the SAN, and must access both the server (SCSI initiator) and the storage (SCSI target). Each appliance must also be connected to an IP network for management. Replication takes place over either FC or standard Internet Protocol. One or more splitters would split traffic to both the storage and the appliances.

Besides integration with EMC products such as AppSync, ViPR, Replication Manager, Control Center and Unisphere, and the Clariion, VNX, Symmetrix and VPLEX storage arrays, RecoverPoint integrates with the following products: Integration with VMware vSphere, VMware Site Recovery Manager and Microsoft Hyper-V allows protection to be specified per virtual machine instead of per volumes that are available to the hypervisor. Integration with Microsoft Shadow Copy, Exchange and SQL Server and Oracle Database Server allows RecoverPoint to temporarily stop writes by the host in order to take consistent application-specific snapshots. Application programming interfaces and command-line interfaces allow customers to integrate with custom internal software.
