= Pei Cao =

Chinese-American computer scientist

- Born: Pei Cao
- Education: Princeton University (PhD)
- Organizations: Google; University of Wisconsin-Madison
- Known for: Counting Bloom filter
- Awards: Presidential Early Career Awards for Scientists and Engineers (1998); National Academy of Engineering (2025); ACM Fellow (2025)
- Scientific career
- Fields: Computer science
- Thesis: Application-Controlled File Caching and Prefetching (1995)
- Doctoral advisor: Kai Li

Pei Cao (Chinese: 曹培) is a Chinese-American computer scientist, and a vice president of engineering at YouTube. She is known for her development of internet infrastructure including web caching, search engines, and data replication. She is a co-inventor of the Counting Bloom filter with Andrei Broder.

== Education and career ==
Cao studied computer science at Tsinghua University, receiving a bachelor's degree in 1990. She continued her studies at Princeton University, where she received a master's degree in 1992 and completed her Ph.D. in 1996, under the supervision of Kai Li.

Cao was an assistant professor at the University of Wisconsin–Madison from 1996 until 1999. She founded Tasmania Network Systems in 1999. Later that year, after Tasmania Network Systems was acquired by Cisco, she joined Cisco. Cao moved to Google in 2004.

== Recognition ==
Cao was a 1998 recipient of the Presidential Early Career Award for Scientists and Engineers, given "for outstanding innovations in cache methods to improve WWW servers and global Internet efficiency, and for new tools for realistic Internet simulators for student use".

Cao was elected to the National Academy of Engineering in 2025, "for contributions to web caching, search engine efficiency, and information quality". She was also elected as an ACM Fellow, in the 2025 class of fellows, with the same citation.

In 2014, Cao's paper on "Search and replication in unstructured peer-to-peer networks" was included in the ACM International Conference on Supercomputing (ISC) top 35 most cited papers in the conference proceedings.
