= Multi Protocol File System =

Network filesystem technology developed and sold by EMC Corporation

The Multi Protocol File System (MPFS) is a multi-path network filesystem technology developed and sold by EMC Corporation. MPFS is intended to allow hundreds to thousands of client computer nodes to access shared computer data with higher performance than conventional NAS file-sharing protocols such as NFS.

== Description ==
MPFS technology is intended for HPC (High Performance Computing) environments in which multiple compute nodes require concurrent access to data sets. This technology can be used to store and access data for grid computing, where the individual computing power of many systems is combined to perform a single process. Example uses include processing geological data, voice recognition datasets, and modal processing. Virtualized computing environments will also benefit from high performance shared storage.

MPFS consists of an agent on the client system and a compatible NAS storage system. The client agent splits the data and meta data for the file being requested. This is done using an FMP (File Mapping Protocol). Requests for the data and its location are sent over conventional NFS to the NAS system. Block data is sent and retrieved directly from the storage device via iSCSI or Fibre Channel. Retrieving data directly from the storage device increases performance by eliminating the file system and protocol overhead associated with NFS or SMB.

The MPFS protocol was developed by EMC for use in NAS storage environments utilizing EMC Celerra and back end storage environments such as the EMC CLARiiON, EMC VNX and Symmetrix.
