= EMC NetWorker =

Backup software

EMC NetWorker (formerly Legato NetWorker) is an enterprise-level data protection software product from Dell EMC that unifies and automates backup to tape, disk-based, and flash-based storage media across physical and virtual environments for granular and disaster recovery.

== Description ==
Cross-platform software support is provided for Linux, Windows, macOS, NetWare, OpenVMS, and Unix environments. Deduplication of backup data is provided by integration with Dell EMC Data Domain products.

A central NetWorker server manages backup clients and NetWorker storage nodes that access the backup media. Platforms supported by the core NetWorker server are: AIX, HP-UX PA-RISC and Itanium, Linux (fully featured on x86, x86-64, Itanium, client only on PowerPC and IBM Z), macOS (client only), Solaris SPARC and x86-64, Silicon Graphics (SGI) IRIX (client only), Tru64, and Windows.

The Java based NetWorker Management Console (NMC) software, which is bundled with the NetWorker distribution, provides a user interface for functions such as client configuration, policy settings, schedules, monitoring, reports, and daily operations for deduplicated and non-deduplicated backups.

The core NetWorker software backs up client file systems and operating system environment. Add-on database and application modules provide backup services for products such as Oracle, DB2, SAP, Lotus, Informix, and Sybase, as well as Microsoft Exchange Server, SharePoint, and SQL Server. Client backup data can be sent to a remote NetWorker storage node or stored on a locally attached device by the use of a dedicated storage node. Additionally, NetWorker supports Client Direct backups allowing clients to back up directly to shared devices bypassing the storage node processes.

NetWorker Snapshot Management automates the generation of point-in-time data snapshots and cloning on supported storage arrays such as EMC VNX, XtremIO, and Symmetrix. The NDMP module can be used for client-less backups of network-attached storage (NAS) Filers like Isilon, EMC VNX or Netapp.

VMware virtual machines can be directly backed up either by installing the NetWorker client on the virtual machine or through the NetWorker VMware Protection to perform application consistent image and file system backups.

NetWorker also supports backup and recovery of Microsoft Windows Server and Hyper-V virtual servers by using the Volume Shadow Copy Services interface. This support protects the parent and child partitions (guests) as well as applications running within the virtual machines.

== History ==
Legato Systems, Inc., the original developer of NetWorker, was founded in 1988 by four individuals who worked together at Sun Microsystems: Jon Kepecs, Bob Lyon, Joe Moran and Russell Sandberg. NetWorker for Unix was first introduced in 1990. The company, located in Palo Alto, California, had its initial public offering in July 1995. Although a relatively modest number of 2 million shares, it was considered run-up to the dot-com bubble. Litigation in 2002 alleged that Legato inflated its revenues in 1999, after restating its earnings. NetWorker came to EMC by the acquisition of Legato in October 2003, for an estimated $1.3 billion.

== See also ==
- List of backup software
