= IBLT =

IBLT may refer to:

- Instance-based learning theory, a theory of how humans make decisions
- Invertible Bloom lookup table, a probabilistic map data structure
