= MPFS =

MPFS may refer to:

- Monty Python's Flying Circus, British comedy group
- Multi Path File System, in computing
- Metropolitan Police Friendly Society, financial services provider to the Met Police
