= Kai Li =

Chinese-American computer scientist

- Born: June 9, 1954 (age 72)
- Education: Jilin University; University of Science and Technology of China; Yale University
- Known for: Distributed shared memory (DSM), Data Domain Inc.
- Scientific career
- Workplaces: Princeton University
- Doctoral advisor: Paul Hudak, Alan Perlis
- Doctoral students: Pei Cao

Kai Li (Chinese: 李凯; born 1954) is a Chinese-American computer scientist and professor of Princeton University. He is noted for his work on Distributed Shared Memory (DSM) and co-founding the storage deduplication company Data Domain Inc. which was acquired by EMC Corporation in 2009.

In 2012, Li was elected as a member into the National Academy of Engineering for advances in data storage and distributed computer systems.

== Background ==
Kai received his Ph.D. degree from Yale University in 1986 and then joined Princeton University. Prior to that, he received his B.S. degree from Jilin University and M.S. degree from University of Science and Technology of China.

== Academic contribution ==
In 1986, Kai Li published his PhD dissertation entitled "Shared Virtual Memory on Loosely Coupled Microprocessors", thus opening up the field of research that is now known as distributed shared memory (DSM) which allows users to program using a shared-memory programming model on clusters. Since this work, there has been a huge amount of work done to extend the idea to other areas (e.g., distributed object based systems and operating systems) and to improve DSM's performance. After joining Princeton, Li himself also led the Scalable High-performance Really Inexpensive MultiProcessor (SHRIMP) project, which investigated how to build a high-performance parallel computer on a cluster of PC servers. Key contributions are virtual-memory mapped communication mechanism to achieve protected user-level communication which contributed significantly to the Remote Direct Memory Access (RDMA) mechanism, in the Virtual Interface Architecture standard, and the Infiniband standard, which are the communication mechanisms for the Direct Access File System (DAFS).

He collaborated with Fei-Fei Li as the co-PI for the ImageNet project to enable the deep learning revolution.

He has made contributions in multiple areas in computer science, including computer architecture, operating systems, parallel and distributed systems, storage systems, machine learning, content-based search, privacy preservation. He had test-of-time / most influential papers in seven different areas in computer science (see below).

== Entrepreneur experience ==
During his sabbatical from Princeton in 2001, Kai is the principal founder (other co-founders are Brian Biles and Ben Zhu) of Data Domain Corporation which built the first commercial deduplication storage system, opening up a new billion-dollar market. He led the initial and subsequent technology innovations for the Data Domain product line. In June 2009, EMC Corporation acquired Data Domain for $2.4 billion, outbidding NetApp's previous offer. In 2010, the Data Domain product line captured 64.2% of the market for purpose-built backup devices worldwide, including mainframes.

In Data Domain, he served as initial chief executive officer (CEO) and then chief technology officer (CTO) from October 2001 to August 2002. From September 2002 onward, he served as its chief scientist.

Prior to joining Data Domain, he served as an industry consultant to AT&T, Bell Labs, Digital Equipment Corporation, Intel, and NEC. He served as a director of Pattern Insight Inc. and served as advisory board members of EMC Corporation, Inphi Corporation, Intel research labs, and Open Innovation Center of Samsung Corporation.

== Test-of-Time/Influential Papers ==
- 1998 One of the 43 influential papers in 25 years of the international symposia on Computer architecture.
- 2004 One of the 50 influential papers in 20 Years of the ACM SIGPLAN Conference on Programming Language Design and Implementation.
- 2012 ACM SIGOPS Hall of Fame Award.
- 2017 VLDB Test-of-Time Award.
- 2019 PAMI Longuet-Higgins Prize (Retrospective Most Impactful Paper from CVPR 2009).
- 2020 USENIX FAST Test-of-time award.
- 2021 Test-of-time award in 50 years of ICPP.

== Selected honors ==
- 1998 Elected as an ACM fellow for "fundamental contributions to computer systems and architecture, by introducing and demonstrating the effectiveness of Shared Virtual Memory."
- 2011 Elected as an IEEE fellow for "contributions to distributed shared memory, cluster communication, and deduplication storage systems."
- 2012 Elected to the National Academy of Engineering with citation "for advances in data storage and distributed computer systems."
- 2024 Wilbur Cross Medal
