= Dell EMC XtremIO =

Enterprise storage platform

- Developer: Dell EMC (2012 - current); XtremIO (2009 - 2012)
- Type: Storage server
- Released: 2009; 17 years ago
- Website: delltechnologies.com/.../storage/xtremio-all-flash

Dell EMC XtremIO is Dell EMC's high-volume, high-capacity all-flash enterprise storage platform. The current version is the X2 line. The XtremIO X2 storage platform is primarily designed for applications that benefit from its data reduction and copy data management capabilities. It also targets organizations with large VDI deployments.

== History ==
The XtremIO company was founded in 2009 by a group of Israeli high-tech veterans that included Aryeh Mergi, a co-founder of M-Systems; Chairman of the Board, Shuki Bruck, the Gordon and Betty Moore Professor at Caltech; Yaron Segev; and CEO Ehud Rokach, a former senior executive at Orckit and CEO of Corrigent. The company raised $25 million in two funding rounds from investors including Israel-based Jerusalem Venture Partners (JVP) and Giza Venture Capital and U.S.-based Battery Ventures and Lightspeed Venture Partners.

The company was acquired by EMC Corporation in May, 2012 for US$430 million, while the technology was still in development. Considered a gamble by some experts, the acquisition was soon followed by additional merger activity in the flash market. Known as the home of the USB flash drive, Israel fostered companies like XtremIO, M-Systems, Anobit and others that were attracting a lot of attention from U.S.-based firms for their talent and technology.

XtremIO arrays entered the market in early 2013 for limited testing, and the product line was officially launched by EMC on November 14 of that year. The first generation product was built around 6U storage nodes called X-Bricks. These featured N-way active controllers, 250,000 random 4K read IOPS and sub-millisecond response time. They were originally scalable to four X-Bricks, linked by dual InfiniBand, delivering 1 million IOPS.

XtremIO reached $1 billion in sales in 2015, expanded the capacity of the product and introduced efficient copy data management at the storage layer (iCDM), among other incremental improvements.

The XtremIO X2 line was introduced in May, 2017. It introduced enhancements to the iCDM software and multi-dimensional scaling, among other enhancements. Hardware density was increased; the X2 features more processing cores and a 4U controller head instead of the old 6U profile. The system also shipped with higher capacity flash drives which deliver greater density. Software and hardware improvements allow XtremIO X2 systems to scale more incrementally than earlier XtremIO systems, allowing both scale-up capacity growth by adding storage to a single X-Brick (new to X2), and scale-out capacity growth by adding additional X-Bricks (possible in earlier configurations).

These differences enabled significant performance gains (80% improvement in response times) but prohibit the coexistence of X1 and X2 hardware in the same cluster. Different clusters can be managed within the same IT interface, however.

== Technology and Architecture ==
The base unit of the XtremIO X2 line is the X-Brick. XtremIO X2 X-Bricks are available in two types: X2-S and X2-R. X2-S configurations are used for virtual desktops with lower capacity requirements and high IO density. X2-R configurations are used for a variety of cases, from virtual servers to database workloads.

Each X-Brick consists of two active-active controller nodes and a drive bay. Individual X-Bricks can scale up by adding as few as two SSDs at a time to any single brick. The capacity range for a single X2-S X-Brick is 7.2-28.8 TB, and the capacity range for a single X2-R X-Brick is 34.5-138.2 TB.

X-Bricks can be combined in clusters for additional scaling of both capacity and performance. IOPS performance scales linearly with each additional X-Brick. Up to 8 X-Bricks can be combined into a single cluster with a raw capacity of up to 1.1 PB, which the company claims is an effective capacity of 5.5 PB due to the 6:1 data efficiency ratio achieved through what it calls “intelligent data packing.” X-Brick interconnectivity is achieved using 40 Gbps InfiniBand. XtremIO uses remote procedure calls (RPC) for control messages and remote direct memory access (RDMA) for moving data blocks.

The full-mesh RDMA network running on Infiniband maintains a consistent path length to each data block, which in turn provides the same latency. The XIOS operating system software, which sits on top of a Linux kernel inside each storage controller, manages the system's functional modules, RDMA over InfiniBand operations, monitoring and memory pools. It is optimized for handling high I/O rates. Every storage controller runs a combination of different modules and shares the total load. These distributed (across different controllers) software modules handle each individual I/O operation, which traverses the cluster. XtremIO handles each I/O request by two software modules (2 hops), no matter if it is a single X-Brick system or a multiple X-brick cluster, again ensuring consistent latency, regardless of the size of the cluster. XIOS features global inline deduplication and compression, thin provisioning, snapshot architecture, XDP Data Protection and full VAAI Integration.
