= Dell EMC Unity =

Storage array product

- Developer: Dell EMC
- Type: Storage server
- Released: 2016; 10 years ago
- CPU: x86
- Predecessor: EMC VNX, Clariion
- Website: Unity XT

Dell EMC Unity is one of Dell EMC's mid-range storage array product lines. It was designed from the ground up as the next-generation midrange unified storage array after the EMC VNX and VNXe series, which evolved out of the EMC Clariion SAN disk array.

== History ==
=== Predecessors ===
Clariion’s predecessor, HADA (High Availability Disk Array) was developed in 1991 by Data General Corporation, one of the first minicomputer companies. HADA was designed to significantly improve the performance of commodity hard disk drives by running large numbers of them in parallel. It was one of the first products on the market with a cached RAID system, and featured hot-swapping and several other innovations.

HADA was initially sold exclusively as an array with the company's Aviion line of computer systems as the HADA (High Availability Disk Array) and later the HADA II before being made available for broader open systems attachment and renamed CLARiiON in 1994. Fibre Channel support was added in 1997.

As CLARiiON sales grew, Data General created a separate CLARiiON division and began selling the product both direct to Aviion and Data General MV customers, but also as an OEM offering to its systems competitors, including Sun Microsystems, Hewlett Packard and Silicon Graphics. CLARiiON was considered the primary value generator in EMC Corporation’s decision to purchase Data General in 1999.

Development of the CLARiiON product line continued under EMC. The company introduced IP-based storage access in 2000. In 2001, Dell and EMC entered into a partnership, and the CLARiiON line began being resold by Dell. In 2002, the CX200, CX400 and CX600 entry-level lines were introduced, the result of the year-long collaboration between the two companies. In 2003, CLARiiON became the industry's first NEBS-certified storage system.

Subsequent processor and bandwidth upgrades led to a new CX lineup (CX300, CX500, CX700) and a low-end, SATA-based CLARiiON array, the AX100 (now updated to AX150).

In May 2006, EMC introduced the third generation of CLARiiON, named CX3 UltraScale. The lineup, consisting of the CX and CX3-80, was the industry's only storage platform to leverage end-to-end 4 Gbit/s (4 billion bits per second) Fibre Channel and PCI-Express technologies. Later in 2007, the line was expanded to include a new entry-level storage system, the CX3-10.

Development continued until 2011, when EMC introduced the new VNX series of unified storage disk arrays intended to combine and replace both CLARiiON and Celerra products. The new suite of VNX SAN/NAS arrays included three product lines: an entry-level VNXe, the VNX5000 series and the VNX7000 series. The new VNX line was marketed as the only storage system offering automated file and block sub-LUN tiering using its FAST technology.

In early 2012, with development continuing on the VNX lines, both CLARiiON and Celerra were discontinued. Development efforts in 2012 and 2013 included a strong focus on supporting data warehousing applications and multicore architectures, culminating in MCx, billed by some as the second generation of VNX. The massive hyperthreading enabled by multicore architectural support led to significant improvements in caching, file IOPS and database transaction rates. In 2014, MCx support was added to the VNXe line.

=== Release ===
Dell EMC Unity was introduced in 2016. The new platform virtualized the “data mover” NAS functionality originally developed for the Celerra product line and moved it into software, simplifying hardware setup and enabling file system upgrades. The transition from VNX to Unity was described by Dell EMC insider as replacing an entire car part-by-part in the middle of a race, without pit stops. The improvements outlined in Chad Sacak’s blog post included a 3x performance boost, reduction from a 7U to a 2U form factor, almost 50% power consumption reduction and significantly faster rack installation.

Dell EMC Unity’s new transactional file system supported traditional NAS use cases while better supporting transactional file applications. It included Fibre Channel, FCoE, NFS, SMB 3.0 (CIFS), and iSCSI protocols. All flash and hybrid Dell EMC Unity models were introduced in 2016, as were a new HTML5 user interface and, later that year, inline compression with inline data deduplication scheduled for later in 2017.

In May 2017, Dell EMC Unity was updated to support many new features and capabilities including Dynamic Pools. This is a new Pool type introduced in Dell Unity OE version 4.2.x allowing users to flexibly add 1 or more drives at a time. This helps reduce drive rebuild times and flash wear when compared to the use of Traditional Pools. A Dynamic Pool is created by default when creating a Pool in Unisphere with Dell EMC Unity OE version 4.2.x and later. Dynamic Pools are only supported on Dell EMC Unity All Flash Systems. Additionally with the May release, support for a 256 TB file system and compression for file, block archiving to the cloud, thin clones with snapshots and AppSync integration for integrated Copy Data Management (iCDM), and Data-At-Rest-Encryption (D@RE) External Key Manager were all included.

In June, 2017, roughly 10 months after the Dell EMC Merger finalized, Dell Technologies announced that cumulative bookings (sales and anticipated sales) of Dell EMC Unity All-flash and hybrid flash storage had surpassed US$1 billion.

== Specifications ==
System configurations as of February, 2017, based on Unity OE 4.1 OS, are as follows:

| Attribute | Unity 300/300F | Unity 400/400F | Unity 500/500F | Unity 600/600F |
|---|---|---|---|---|
| Processor | 2 x Intel 6-core, 1.6 GHz | 2 x Intel 8-core, 2.4 GHz | 2 x Intel 10-core, 2.6 GHz | 2 x Intel 12-core, 2.5 GHz |
| Memory (Both SP) | 48 GB | 96 GB | 128 GB | 256 GB |
| Minimum/Maximum drives | 5/150 | 5/250 | 5/500 | 5/1000 |
| Maximum raw capacity* | 2.34 PBs | 3.91 PBs | 7.81 PBs | 9.77 PBs |
| Max IO modules | 4 | 4 | 4 | 4 |
| Max number of pools | 20 | 30 | 40 | 100 |
| Max LUN Size | 256TB | 256TB | 256TB | 256TB |
| Max File System Size | 64 TB | 64 TB | 64 TB | 64 TB |
| Max LUNs per array | 1,000 | 1,500 | 2,000 | 6,000 |

- Maximum raw capacity may vary.

In June, 2017, Dell EMC announced four new models:

| Attribute | Unity 350F | Unity 450F | Unity 550F | Unity 650F |
|---|---|---|---|---|
| Processor | 2 x Intel 6-core, 1.7 GHz | 2 x Intel 10-core, 2.2 GHz | 2 x Intel 14-core, 2.0 GHz | 2 x Intel 14-core, 2.4 GHz |
| Memory (Both SP) | 96 GB | 128 GB | 256 GB | 512 GB |
| Minimum/Maximum drives | 6/150 | 6/250 | 6/500 | 6/1000 |
| Maximum raw capacity* | 2.4 PBs | 4.0 PBs | 8.0 PBs | 16 PBs |
| Max IO modules | 4 | 4 | 4 | 4 |
| Max number of pools | 20 | 30 | 40 | 100 |
| Max LUN Size | 256TB | 256TB | 256TB | 256TB |
| Max File System Size | 256TB | 256TB | 256TB | 256TB |
| Max LUNs per array | 1,000 | 1,500 | 2,000 | 6,000 |

- Maximum raw capacity may vary.

== Technology and Architecture ==
The Dell EMC Unity product line includes the hybrid (flash + HDD) 300/400/500/600 models, the all-flash 300F/400F/500F/600F models, and the Dell EMC Unity VSA virtual appliance deployable on vSphere. The basic enclosure for the hybrid and all-flash models is a 2U box with 25-2.5-inch drive slit expansion trays, called a Disk Processor Enclosure (DPE). A 15-drive 3.5-inch hybrid DPE variant is also available. Additional storage can be added using disk-array enclosures (DAEs), available in 2U 2.5-inch 25-drive, 3U 3.5-inch 15-drive and 3U 2.5-inch 80-drive configurations.

The first four drives in a Dell EMC Unity DPE are system drives that contain the Dell EMC Unity OE (Operating Environment). Any remaining drive space is available for storage pools, with a minimum configuration of five drives for the 300/400/500/600 models, and six drives for the 350/450/550/650 models (including the four system drives). The drive bays are accessible from the front of the rack. The storage processors (SPs), optical/twinex network ports, 10 Gb Base-T RJ45 ports, power supplies, IO module slots, backend SAS ports, management port and service port can be found in the rear of the DPE. The IO modules are configurable, supporting configurations that include 4 port 16 GB Fiber Channel, 10GbE Base-T, 1GbE Base-T, 2 port 10GbE Optical (SFP+ and Twinax), 4 port 10GbE Optical (SFP+ and Twinax) and 12 Gb SAS for backend expansion (Only for Dell EMC Unity 500 and 600). Dell EMC Unity supports Active Twinax cables only – there is no support for passive Twinax.

Dell EMC Unity SPs contain a built-in battery backup unit (BBU) that will supply power to the SP long enough to dump cache contents into an M.2 SSD. This cached content can be restored once power is restored or a malfunctioning SP is replaced. Each M.2 SSD also contains Dell EMC Unity OE boot image.

The Dell EMC Unity OE is based on SUSE Linux Enterprise Server (SLES). Unity provides block and file access to hosts and clients. Dell EMC Unity is an Asymmetric Active-Active array and is Asymmetric Logical Unit Access (ALUA) aware.

Dell EMC Unity’s Multicore Cache dynamically adjusts cache sizes according to the read and write operation, minimizing forced flushing when the high watermark level on the cache is reached. This functionality can be augmented through the implementation of Dell EMC’s fully automated storage tiering (FAST) cache. FAST cache monitors incoming I/O for access frequency and automatically copies frequently accessed data from the back-end drives into the cache. It can extend existing cache capacities up to 2 terabytes.

Dell EMC Unity OE provides block LUN, VMware Virtual Volumes (VVols) and NAS file system storage access. Multiple different storage resources can reside in the same storage pool, and multiple storage pools can be configured within the same DPE/DAE array. Each storage pool is tiered based on the performance characteristics of the storage technology used, with SSD-based storage at the top “extreme performance tier,” serial-attached SCSI (SAS) in the middle “performance tier” and near line SAS (NL-SAS) in the bottom “capacity tier.” RAID protection is applied at the tier level.

Dell EMC Unity uses FAST VP (Fully Automated Storage Tiering for Virtual Pools) algorithms to move “hot” (high-demand) data to SSD and “cold” (low-demand) data to NL-SAS. The policy can be adjusted using Unisphere. In-pool tiers can be expanded using any supported stripe width.

As of Dell EMC Unity OE 4.1, inline compression is available for block LUNs and VMware VMFS Datastores in all-flash pools.
