= Infra Corporation =

American software company, 1991–2014

- Industry: Software, IT Service Management
- Founded: 1991
- Defunct: 2014
- Fate: Acquired by EMC Corporation; later absorbed into VMware then Alemba
- Headquarters: Australia (founded); offices in North America, UK and Europe
- Products: infraEnterprise

Infra Corporation was an IT Service Management (ITSM) software company founded in 1991 in Australia. Its principal product, infraEnterprise, was a multi-tier web-based ITSM tool built around the ITIL framework, covering service desk, incident management, change management, release management, configuration management (including federated CMDB), availability management, service level management and a knowledge base module aligned with Knowledge-Centered Support (KCS) principles.

The company was acquired by EMC Corporation in 2008, and its product subsequently passed through VMware before being acquired and rebranded by Alemba as vFire Core.

== History ==
Infra Corporation was established in 1991 in Australia, and expanded to operate regional offices in North America, Australia, the UK and Europe, with a worldwide network of partners and distributors.

In 2002, infraEnterprise was awarded PinkVerify ITIL certification from Pink Elephant, an independent ITIL consulting firm. The product won Network Computing magazine's "Helpdesk Product of the Year" award in 2007, and HDI's Best Business Use of Business Support Technology in 2006 at the 11th Annual Help Desk and IT Support Excellence Awards.

=== Acquisition by EMC ===
Infra was acquired by Hopkinton, Massachusetts–based EMC Corporation on 10 March 2008, as part of EMC's strategy to expand from storage products into IT management services.

VMware acquired the product — then branded Ionix Service Manager — in 2010 and rebranded it VMware Service Manager. Support commenced on 1 July 2010.

In July 2014, VMware and ITSM software company Alemba agreed to transfer development and support of VMware Service Manager to Alemba. Alemba rebranded the product as vFire Core, releasing vFire Core 9.2.0 in December 2014 as its first major version under new ownership. VMware had previously announced end of support for version 9.x as of 8 March 2017.
