= James C. Kenny =

American ambassador and businessman

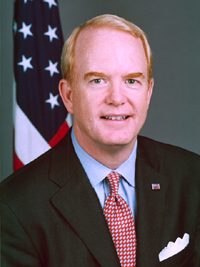

United States Ambassador to Ireland
- In office October 31, 2003 – August 13, 2006
- President: George W. Bush
- Preceded by: Richard J. Egan
- Succeeded by: Thomas C. Foley

Personal details
- Born: 1953 (age 72–73)
- Party: Republican
- Children: 4
- Education: Bradley University (BS)

James Casey Kenny (born 1953) is a Chicago businessman who served as United States Ambassador to Ireland from 2003 to 2006.

== Career ==
Kenny received his Bachelor of Science degree in Business Administration from Bradley University in Peoria, Illinois. He was executive vice president of Kenny Construction Company from 1994 to 2012, and president of Kenny Management Services from 2006 to 2012.

Former President George H. W. Bush, whose Presidential campaign was financially supported by Kenny, appointed Kenny to the National Corporation for Housing Partnerships. Kenny also served on the transition team for President George W. Bush from 2000 to 2001, and he was a member of President Bush's first overseas delegation in February 2002, traveling to Nicaragua for the inauguration of President Enrique Bolaños.

Kenny was appointed as ambassador to Ireland on October 6, 2003. After confirmation by the Senate, he presented his credentials to the President of Ireland, Mary McAleese, on October 31, 2003. Kenny's formal title was Ambassador Extraordinary and Plenipotentiary. He served as ambassador until August 13, 2006.

Kenny received an honorary Doctor of Humane Letters in 2005, from Lynn University and American College Dublin. In 2011, Kenny was elected to the board of directors of Kerry Group, and in 2016 he was elected to the board of Hub Group.

== Personal life ==
Kenny and his wife, Margaret, have four children.

Diplomatic posts
Preceded by Richard J. Egan	United States Ambassador to Ireland; 2003–2006	Succeeded by Thomas C. Foley
