= Connectrix =

Brand of storage area network switches

Connectrix is the family name for EMC Corporation's brand of storage area network (SAN) switches (also called "directors" for larger models). EMC does not manufacture any of these devices, instead they rebadge several other brands.

In many cases the EMC version of a switch will have customized EMC firmware, which will improve larger SAN design and/or compatibility between multi-vendor products. These customizations are usually created by the original switch vendor to EMC's requirements.

== Switch families ==
EMC switch families, based on performance and connectivity features, range from enterprise-class to edge devices.

The switch families are:

- ED - Enterprise Director
- DS - Departmental Switch
- MP - Multi-Protocol Router

== OEM identification ==
The original switch vendor can usually be deciphered from the EMC model name. Typically, model numbers are the same as the original number and the model name is suffixed with a letter denoting the original brand - B or M, for Brocade Communications Systems and McData (which was acquired by Brocade) respectively.

EMC also rebadges Cisco Systems MDS series switches. These have the prefix MDS and no suffix, clearly not conforming to the EMC nomenclature.

For example:

- DS-4100B = Brocade Silkworm 4100
- ED-10000M = McData Intrepid 10000
- MDS 9216i = Cisco MDS 9216i
