= Roger Marino =

American engineer and businessman

Roger M. Marino
- Born: Revere, Massachusetts
- Education: Northeastern University
- Occupations: Engineer, businessman
- Known for: Co-founder of EMC Corporation
- Title: President of EMC Corporation
- Term: 1979–1992
- Board member of: Northeastern University Board of Trustees

Roger M. Marino is a retired American engineer, businessman, and co-founder of EMC Corporation. His substantial contribution to Northeastern University funded their athletic center, which has been named in Marino's honor.

== Corporate career ==
Roger M. Marino graduated from Northeastern University in 1961. In 1979 Marino founded the high technology design and manufacturing company EMC Corporation with his former Northeastern roommate, Richard Egan. He served as the company's president until he retired from the position in 1992. EMC Corporation entered the Fortune 500 Companies list in 1994. Since his retirement, Marino has been active in funding a number of start-up companies. In 2001, Marino founded the film production company Revere Pictures with filmmaker Michael Corrente. Marino currently serves as a director of TechTarget, Incorporated.

== Sports investments ==
In 1997 Roger Marino purchased a 100% stake in the Pittsburgh Penguins NHL team for the price of $40 million. Roger transferred ownership 4 years later. Marino has expressed a strong interest in an ownership stake in the Boston Red Sox, but has yet to make the investment.

== Net worth ==
In its 2000 list of the Forbes 400, Marino was ranked as the 236th richest American, with a net worth of approximately $1.2 billion.
