= Richard J. Egan =

American businessman and diplomat (1936–2009)

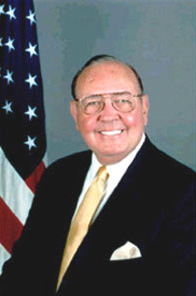

United States Ambassador to Ireland
- In office September 10, 2001 – January 31, 2003
- President: George W. Bush
- Preceded by: Mike Sullivan
- Succeeded by: James C. Kenny

Personal details
- Born: February 28, 1936 Milton, Massachusetts, U.S.
- Died: August 28, 2009 (aged 73) Boston, Massachusetts, U.S.
- Party: Republican
- Spouse: Maureen Fitzgerald (m. 1965)
- Children: 5
- Education: Northeastern University
- Known for: Co-founder of EMC Corporation

Military service
- Allegiance: United States
- Branch/service: United States Marine Corps
- Battles/wars: Korean War

Richard John Egan (February 28, 1936 – August 28, 2009) was an American business executive, political fundraiser, and United States Ambassador to Ireland (2001–2003).

== Career ==
Egan was born in Milton, Massachusetts, and attended high school in the Dorchester neighborhood of Boston. He was a helicopter crewman in the United States Marine Corps during the end of the Korean War, then received a bachelor's in electrical engineering from Northeastern University in 1961 and a master's at M.I.T. He later was on the team that helped develop Project Apollo memory systems for NASA, and worked at Lockheed Martin, Honeywell, and Intel before founding EMC Corporation.

In 1979, he founded EMC with Roger Marino, who had been a classmate at Northeastern. The two initially sold office furniture in order to raise money to build the company with only a handful of employees. EMC eventually became Massachusetts' largest technology company and had more than 40,000 employees by 2009. In the 2005 list of the Forbes 400, Egan was ranked as the 258th richest American, with a net worth of approximately $1.3 billion.

== Philanthropy ==
Egan was a leader in numerous educational, business and technology groups, serving as director of the Massachusetts High Technology Council and Business Roundtable, director of the New York Stock Exchange Advisory Board, and founder of the Hopkinton Technology for Education Foundation in Hopkinton, Massachusetts, where EMC was based. He donated part of his fortune to the Boy Scouts of America as well as health and education groups. He played critical role in the creation of the Maureen and Richard J. Egan Engineering/Science Research Center, dedicated in October 1996 at Northeastern University, his alma mater.

He started an engineering center in Israel to help develop EMC's products and he was credited with greatly improving Israel's technology infrastructure.

== Ireland ==
Following significant fundraising for George W. Bush's 2000 presidential campaign, Egan was one of 19 Bush Pioneers to become an ambassador; his sons Christopher and Michael were also Pioneers.

Egan retired from EMC on January 17, 2001, becoming Chairman Emeritus, in order to accept an appointment by President Bush to serve as the US ambassador to Ireland. After confirmation by the Senate, he presented his credentials to President of Ireland Mary McAleese on September 10, 2001. He had the official title of Ambassador Extraordinary and Plenipotentiary, and served in the role until January 31, 2003.

== Recognition ==
In 1994, Inc. magazine named Egan "Master Entrepreneur of the Year." He also received the Medal of Honor Society's Patriot Award, the Jewish National Fund Tree of Life Award, and was one of Irish America magazine's "Top 100". Egan received honorary degrees from Northeastern University, New England Institute of Technology, and the University of Ulster.

== Death ==
Egan died by suicide at his Boston residence on August 28, 2009, aged 73, while suffering from terminal lung cancer. According to his family, he also suffered from emphysema and diabetes. He was survived by his wife, Maureen, and their five children.

Diplomatic posts
Preceded by Michael J. Sullivan	United States Ambassador to Ireland; 2001–2003	Succeeded by James C. Kenny
