= EMC ViPR =

ViPR Controller is a software-defined storage offering from EMC Corporation announced on May 6, 2013, at EMC World. ViPR abstracts storage from disparate arrays into a single pool of storage capacity that "makes it easier to manage and automate its own data-storage devices and those made by competitors." ViPR became generally available September 27, 2013.

== Description and core components ==
ViPR is deployed as software-only virtual appliances on ESX servers and does not require the installation of new hardware.

ViPR separates the data plane from the control plane. The control plane is a software layer that manages storage; the data plane is the storage infrastructure, including networks, where storage devices perform reads and writes to disks and/or memory.

ViPR enables management of multivendor platforms, including third-party storage. With the ViPR Controller, users abstract physical storage into virtual storage pools, create storage categories or classes (such as high-performance file or "gold/silver/bronze" block), and automate storage delivery to users to access through a self-service catalog.

Enterprise Management Associates states "the underlying idea of EMC ViPR is to deliver enterprise storage similar to the way Amazon offers virtual machines, enabling corporate developers to provision storage in a self-service manner."

REST APIs provide a central access and control point to manage storage arrays or devices. REST APIs are used to integrate ViPR with third-party applications and management tools, as well as cloud stacks such as VMware, OpenStack and Microsoft Hyper-V.

In addition to the ViPR Controller, ViPR includes ViPR Global Data Services, which enable combinations of data type (e.g. block, file, and object), protocols. EMC supports object files and Hadoop using a software overlay based on ViPR. The ViPR Object Data Service exposes REST APIs for Atmos (EMC's object storage appliance), Amazon S3 and Swift (the native OpenStack object store service), which means that pools potentially use both cloud services and local [EMC] VNX and Isilon arrays. ViPR's prestidigitation enables data written as objects by cloud applications to be accessible as files by legacy apps.

Similar to the way ViPR provides object support, it can provision pools as a Hadoop file system (HDFS).

This is significant because it means data stored in a traditional block storage VMAX array can be exposed to big data Hadoop applications without moving it to a separate file repository. Theoretically, this could allow the same set of physical data to serve as a traditional transactional database while simultaneously incorporating into a big data analytics system, in place. (Network Computing.)

== Architecture ==
ViPR is a distributed scale-out software platform. It uses cloud technologies such as Cassandra, an open-source distributed database management system, to handle large amounts of data, workflows and workloads from one management point.

ViPR is a software solution, not a hardware offering, running on a virtual machine. When compared to other solutions, it stands out because those are platforms that provide automation stacks whereas ViPR provides a storage platform that plugs into all of these stacks. (SiliconAngle.)

== Integration ==
In version 1.0, ViPR supports EMC arrays and storage devices and non-EMC arrays such as NetApp. ViPR users have the ability to virtualize, provision, monitor, and report on storage use from additional vendor arrays integrated through third-party developed adaptors written to the ViPR REST-based APIs.

== See also ==
- Software defined storage
