= EMC VPLEX =

Virtual computer data storage product

EMC VPLEX is a virtual computer data storage product introduced by EMC Corporation in May 2010. VPLEX implements a distributed "virtualization" layer within and across geographically disparate Fibre Channel storage area networks and data centers.

== History ==
A previous virtual storage product from EMC Corporation called Invista was announced in 2005. It supported selected storage area network (SAN) switches from Cisco Systems and Brocade Communications Systems that used Fibre Channel connections. Five months after the announcement, Invista had not shipped, and was expected to not have much impact until 2007. A version 2.0 of Invista was released in December 2007, although a year later the product was called "under-delivered". By 2009, some analysts suggested the Invista product might best be shut down, and it was quietly withdrawn.

Another EMC storage product called the Symmetrix Remote Data Facility (SRDF) also was marketed when VPLEX was announced in May 2010, and a competing product was the IBM SAN Volume Controller. The first two products in 2010 were for deployments that were local and "metro" (up to 5 milliseconds delay), with others supporting longer delays promised for the future. A "geo" version was announced in 2011 for replication over wider distances. In 2013, a product marketed with the phrase software-defined storage called EMC ViPR was announced, which could use VPLEX for its data movement.

== Architecture ==
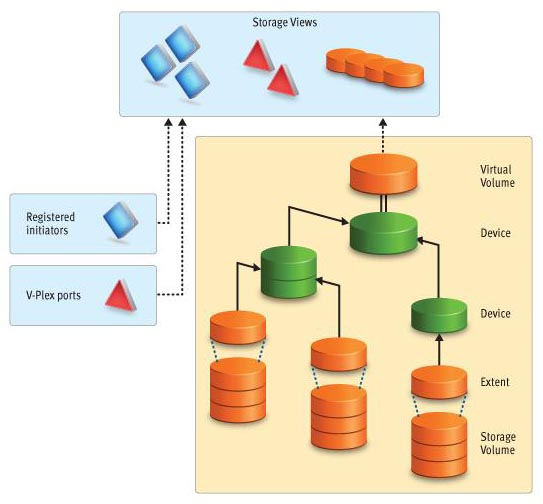
Logical layout

Each VPLEX engine in a cluster consists of two redundant IO directors and one IO annex, each being a single rack unit (1U) physical device. Each engine has 32 Fibre Channel ports (the VS1 model 16 front-end ports and 16 back-end ports) or 16 Fibre Channel ports (the VS2 model has 8 front-end ports and 8 back-end ports) and is protected by two redundant stand-by power supplies.

Each VPLEX director is a bladed multi-core multi-processor x86 virtualization processing unit containing 4 hot-swappable IO modules. The 1U IO annex is used for intra-cluster director communication. Each director runs a Linux kernel and a specialized storage virtualization environment called GeoSynchrony, that provides proprietary clustering capability. Each cluster has a service management station which provides all alerting and software management capabilities.

VPLEX is based on standard EMC building block hardware architecture components such as those used in its Symmetrix product line. VPLEX uses an in-band architecture which means that data flowing between a host and a storage controller flows through one or more directors. On the front end, VPLEX presents an interface to a host which looks like a standard storage controller SCSI target. On the VPLEX back end, the VPLEX provides an interface to a physical storage controller that act like a host, essentially like a SCSI initiator.

A VPLEX cluster consists of one or more pairs of directors (up to 4 pairs). Any director from any engine can failover to any other director in the cluster in the case of hardware or path failure.
