= Infraware =

InfraWare
- Company type: Private
- Industry: Medical technology, legal, healthcare, speech recognition, transcription software
- Founded: 2003
- Headquarters: Terre Haute, Indiana
- Key people: Nick Mahurin (founder)
- Products: InfraWare Dictation, InfraWare 360
- Website: https://InfraWare.com

InfraWare is an American technology company headquartered in Terre Haute, Indiana that focuses on speech transcription and other technologies for machine-assisted documentation.

== History ==
Nick Mahurin founded InfraWare in 1998. However, the company was not officially launched until 2003.

InfraWare published a book about back-end ASR for MTSOs in 2005.

InfraWare received a patent for back-end speech recognition, which was titled "System and Method for Analyzing Verbal Records of Dictation Using Extracted Verbal Features" in 2016. This technology was integrated into the company's First Draft dictation recognition service.

InfraWare began beta testing for a new dictation translation engine in 2018. The engine was developed by combining InfraWare's 360 transcription speech recognition platform with artificial intelligence.

== Systems and platforms ==
InfraWare mainly works on SR dictation systems. InfraWare has released InfraWare Dictation, which allows users to record dictation through a smartphone, computer, or tablet. Dictation is uploaded to a web-based platform, where healthcare transcriptionists transcribe audio files.

InfraWare also provides InfraWare 360, a documentation platform that makes use of First Draft, the company's patented speech recognition software. Back-end speech recognition generates a first draft, which is corrected by transcriptionists.

== Funding and recognition ==
In 2007, InfraWare received a grant from the Terre Haute Innovation Alliance, a partnership of local organizations including Indiana State University, the Rose-Hulman Institute of Technology, and the Terre Haute Economic Development Corporation.

Around 2008, InfraWare received assistance from Indiana's 21st Century Fund project to develop the InfraWare Dictation Recognition Engine.

InfraWare was on the Inc. 5000 list in 2008.
