= EMC Atmos =

Cloud storage services

- Developer: EMC Corporation
- Release: November 2008
- Available in: English
- Type: Cloud storage
- License: Proprietary software
- Website: www.emc.com/storage/atmos/atmos.htm

EMC Atmos is a cloud storage services platform developed by EMC Corporation. Atmos can be deployed as either a hardware appliance or as software in a virtual environment. The Atmos technology uses an object storage architecture designed to manage petabytes of information and billions of objects across multiple geographic locations as a single system.

== History ==
Atmos was developed by EMC Corporation and made generally available in November 2008. The project used the internal code name "Maui". At least one of the researchers on a project called OceanStore at the University of California, Berkeley had also worked on Atmos, using an architecture now known as object storage. A second major release in February 2010 added a "GeoProtect" distributed data protection feature, faster processors and denser hard drives.

During EMC World in May 2011, EMC announced the 2.0 version of Atmos with better performance, more efficient "GeoParity" data protection and expanded access with Windows client software (Atmos GeoDrive) and an Atmos SDK with Centera/XAM and Apple iOS compatibility.

Atmos can be used as data storage for custom or packaged applications using either a REST or SOAP data API, or more traditional storage interfaces like Network File System (NFS) and Server Message Block (SMB). It presents a single unified namespace or object-space, stores information as objects (files and metadata), and manages information by user or administrator-defined policies.
