= Legato (company) =

Israeli artificial intelligence software company

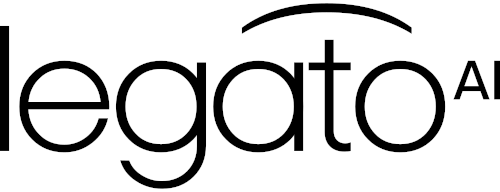
- Type: Private
- Industry: Artificial intelligence Enterprise software
- Founded: 2025
- Founders: Dana Rochman; Shlomit Tennenbaum
- Headquarters: Tel Aviv, Israel
- Key people: Dana Rochman (CEO); Shlomit Tennenbaum (CTO)
- Products: Legato AI platform
- Website: www.legato.ai

Legato is an Israeli artificial intelligence software company that develops an AI-powered platform that enables business users to build applications, workflows, and automations directly within enterprise software platforms using natural language.

Founded in 2025 by Dana Rochman and Shlomit Tennenbaum, the company develops technology that enables enterprise software vendors to embed artificial intelligence capabilities into their products, allowing customers to create software applications and business workflows without writing code.

== History ==
Legato was founded in 2025 by Dana Rochman and Shlomit Tennenbaum, both former executives at Verint with backgrounds in enterprise software, artificial intelligence, and product development.

The company was established to simplify enterprise software customization by allowing business users to create applications and workflows through natural-language prompts instead of relying on software developers or external consultants.

In January 2026, Legato announced that it had raised $7 million in a seed funding round led by S Capital VC, with participation from Cerca Partners and technology entrepreneurs Ran Sarig and Yuval Bar-Gil. The funding was intended to accelerate product development, expand the company's engineering team, and grow its commercial operations.

According to the company, its technology was initially adopted by software-as-a-service (SaaS) vendors in customer relationship management (CRM) and human resources software, with plans to expand into financial services, healthcare, telecommunications, and energy platforms.

== Legato AI platform ==
Legato develops an artificial intelligence platform designed to be embedded directly into enterprise SaaS products. The platform enables business users to create applications, automations, workflows, and AI agents using natural-language prompts without requiring programming knowledge.

The platform uses a multi-agent AI architecture to generate production-ready software while allowing software vendors to retain governance, security, and oversight of customer-created applications.

Legato describes its technology as enabling "in-platform vibe app creation", allowing users to extend existing SaaS products while remaining within the host platform. According to the company, this approach reduces reliance on professional services and software development resources for application customization.

The company also describes its vision as supporting a "Platform Creator Economy", in which enterprise software users can create, customize, and share applications while platform vendors maintain centralized governance and security controls.
