= Uganda Freight Forwarders Association =

UFFA is an acronym for Uganda Freight Forwarders Association formed in 2001 from UCIFA. As a member of FIATA, it aims at promoting professionalism and integrity in the freight forwarding industry in Uganda. Membership to UFFA is for both local and foreign companies involved directly and/ or indirectly in freight logistics (Shipping, Customs clearance, Cargo handling, Warehousing plus Transporting).

As of 2017, the association boasted of a total of 115 members handling over 90% of Uganda import and exports.

== Activities ==
UFFA was part of the team that developed a curriculum for the East African Customs and Freight Forwarding Practicing Certificate Course that has now been jointly implemented with Uganda Revenue Authority. The association embarked on the East African Harmonized Curriculum Training Program that has been the work of the Eastern Africa Revenue Authorities (EARAs) and the Federation of East African Freight Forwarders Associations (FEAFFA). The result of this project will be a mandatory practicing certificate known as the East African Customs and Freight Forwarding Practicing Certificate (EACFFPC) for all customs agents in the region.

== See also ==
- Transport in Uganda
