= Orckit-Corrigent =

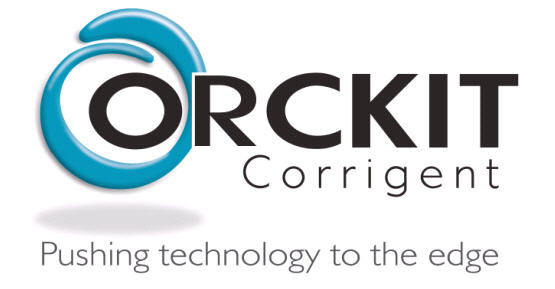
- Type: Public (OTCQB: ORCT)(TASE: ORCT)
- Industry: Telecommunications Equipment
- Founded: 1990
- Defunct: 2015
- Fate: Bankrupted
- Headquarters: Tel Aviv, Israel
- Key people: Co-Founder, Chairman of the Board and President: Izhak Tamir Co-Founder, CEO and Director: Eric Paneth
- Products: Packet Transport Networking Infrastructure
- Revenue: $12.7 million USD (FY 2009)
- Net income: $23 million USD (FY 2009)
- Number of employees: 200+
- Website: www.orckit.com

Orckit-Corrigent was an Israel-based supplier of telecommunications networking equipment and products that facilitated the delivery of Carrier Ethernet and TDM migration applications for telecommunication providers.

Orckit-Corrigent was founded in 1990 and is headquartered in Tel Aviv, Israel. It went public in 1996, making history as the first Israeli company to face excess public demand at its initial public offering (IPO) in NASDAQ. However, despite those initial large contracts the company was unable to renew them. After years of losses, the company underwent a failed debt restructuring agreement in 2012, and entered bankruptcy and liquidation proceedings in mid-2015.

== Corporate history ==
Orckit was founded in 1990 by Izhak Tamir and Eric Paneth.

In September 1996, Orckit announced an initial public offering (IPO) of 3.3 million of its ordinary shares at a public offering price of $16.00. The company then made history when its initial public offering on the Nasdaq over-the-counter exchange was postponed due to oversubscription. This made Orckit the first Israeli company ever to suffer a deferral on Nasdaq as a result of excess public demand.

In 2000, Orckit founded Corrigent Systems as a fully owned subsidiary. This move marked a transformation of the company, which originated as a DSL vendor, into a packet transport network (PTN) vendor. That year, the company began developing and manufacturing PTN products for metro aggregation networks and, Resilient Packet Ring (RPR) technology was developed and introduced to the market as IEEE 802.17 Standard, as part of the company's packet transport technology.

In 2007, Orckit-Corrigent launched its CM4000 PTN line of products, which currently serves multiple telecom providers worldwide, including leading Indian carrier Bharat Sanchar Nigam Ltd. (BSNL), Deutsche Telekom, a leading Pan-European Scandinavian Service Provider, Mexican redIT (formerly MetroNet), and others.

=== Global expansion ===
In August 2009, Orckit-Corrigent opened a new office in Brazil to help strengthen its Latin American presence. In January 2010, Lindsay Ryan was hired as regional sales manager to head a new office in Manila, Philippines. At its peak, the company had international offices in Israel, US, India, Japan, Korea, Germany, Russia, Brazil, Mexico, Thailand, and the Philippines.

In February 2010, VK Aggarwal was appointed new managing director of Orckit-Corrigent's new India headquarters. The company also hired additional employees to better serve existing customers and develop new opportunities in the region.

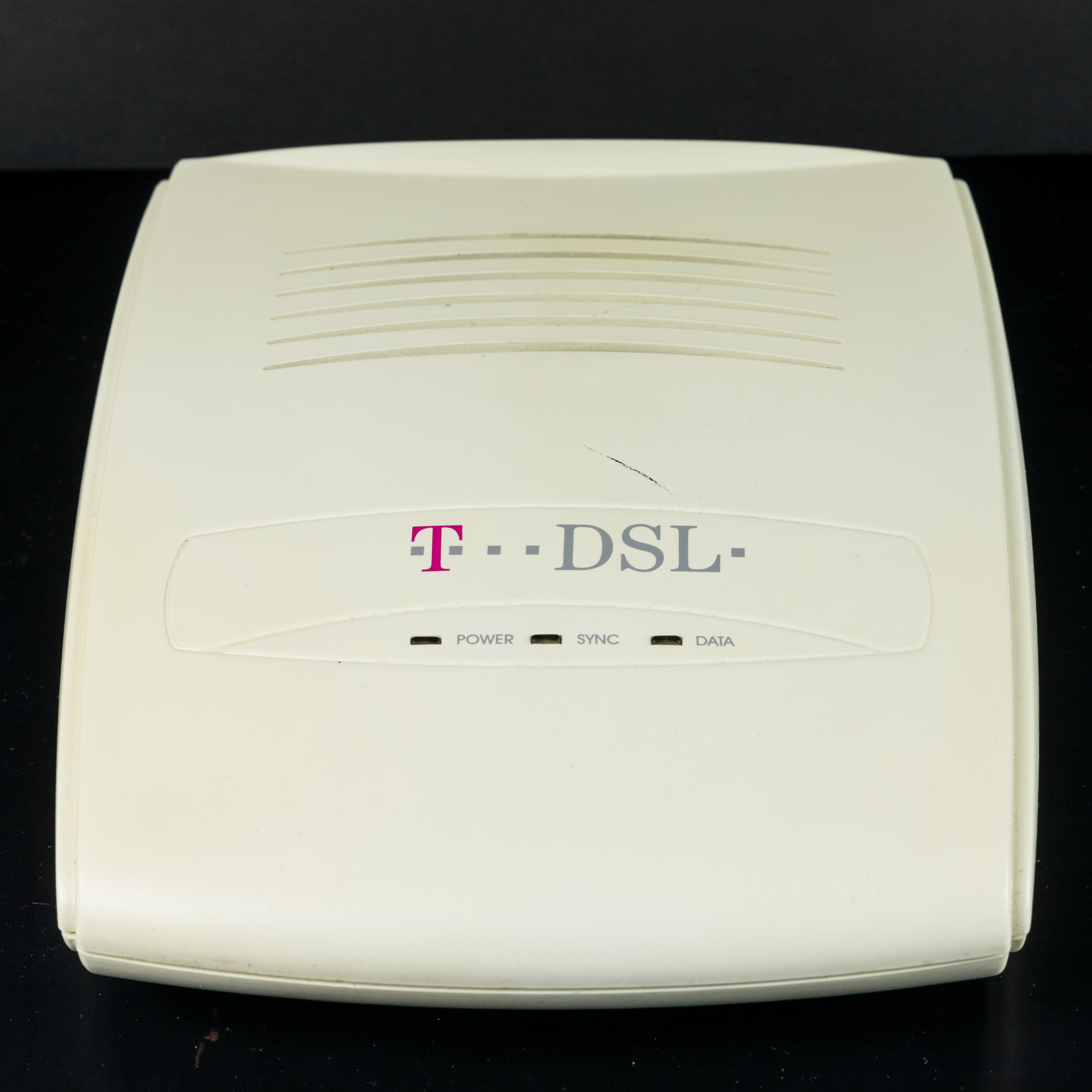
Orckit ORfast-R2, branded for Deutsche Telekom

In March 2010, Orckit-Corrigent opened a new office in Thailand and appointed Monchai Kunwattanakorn as the new VP Sales for Thailand, Laos and Myanmar.

In May 2010, Orckit-Corrigent opened a new sales office and service center in Germany, headed by Bernd Muehlhaus. This was an important move for the company, as the European region captured approximately a third of the global Carrier Ethernet market. Orckit-Corrigent was active in the German market, having signed an agreement with Media Broadcast GmbH for Deutsche Telekom in 2008.

== Bankruptcy ==
Following the "dot com boom", Orckit amassed increasing debt throughout the 2000-2010 decade, ultimately reaching a debt restructuring agreement with its creditors in 2012. In June 2014 the company was valued at US$1.7 million, down from a peak of US$2 billion in the early 2000s. As of June 2015, the company was in liquidation proceedings and was expected to be sold as a stock exchange shell. In 2021, the corporate website merely contained financial runoff information, by 2022 it was no longer operational.

== Market ==
Orckit-Corrigent offered networking infrastructure for the delivery of residential, business and mobile backhauling services in packet-based networks. Orckit-Corrigent focused on what the company termed time-division multiplexing (TDM) migration, whereby carriers operating legacy SDH networks with growing levels of Ethernet traffic are offered the ability to progressively transition to a network where traffic is offloaded to a platform that can handle both TDM and Ethernet services.

Orckit-Corrigent targeted the carrier Ethernet switch (router) market and optical networking equipment market, offering application delivery for the PTN market and TDM migration for MSPP installed-base.

The company's PTN included standard and interoperable MPLS and MPLS-TP switches, enabling packet, as well as legacy services, over packet transport networks. It also offered circuit emulation and packet synchronization technologies as one of the building blocks for the TDM upgrade.

== Products ==
The CM-4000 product family contained a series of packet transport network switches. It consisted of the CM-4140, CM-4206 and CM-4314T/4314 models. Orckit's CM-401x portfolio of switches included the CM-4011, CM-4012 and CM-4013 products and was fully compatible with the company's metro aggregation products.
