= Knowledge-centered support =

Service delivery method

Knowledge-Centered Service (KCS; previously known as Knowledge-Centered Support) is a service delivery method that focuses on knowledge as a key asset of the organization implementing it. Development began in 1992 by the Consortium for Service Innovation, a non-profit alliance of service organizations. Its methodology is to integrate use of a knowledge base into the workflow.

While the legacy of KCS lies in customer support organizations, the methodology is now being adopted across all the functions of business, as noted in the latest version of the KCS v6 Practices Guide.

KCS seeks to:

- Create content as a by-product of solving problems
- Evolve content based on demand and usage
- Develop a knowledge base of an organization's collective experience to-date
- Reward learning, collaboration, sharing and improving

With over 20 years in development and over $50 million invested in developing the methodology, KCS has produced significant benefits for support organizations around the world, including Apollo Group, Autodesk, Avaya, Dell, EMC, Ericsson, HP Enterprise, Omgeo/DTCC, Oracle, PTC, Salesforce.com, SDL and SailPoint.

The KCS Academy is a wholly owned subsidiary of the Consortium for Service Innovation. The KCS Academy is the only designated certification body by the Consortium for Service Innovation. The KCS Academy offers certification programs for people and a KCS Verified program for knowledge base tools that enable the KCS practices.

== History ==
Development began in 1992 by the Consortium for Service Innovation, a non-profit alliance of support organizations. Its premise is to capture, structure, and reuse technical support knowledge. Initially it was known as Solution-Centered Support, and was renamed to acknowledge the methodology as best practices in knowledge management.

The Consortium for Service Innovation was founded in Seattle in 1992 by Symbologic. Shelly Benton was the founding Executive Director and built the membership-based organization. The early work of the Consortium was used to identify features and functionality for a tool that would help organizations capture and reuse knowledge as a by-product of doing work.

From 1992 to 1994 the nature of the member's conversation was largely focused on technology. However the members began to see that success in capturing and reusing knowledge was more about people and their behaviors than it was about the tool. From 1994 to 1996 the conversation shifted to defining a methodology that focused on people and the organizational culture.

As the conversation evolved both the members of the Consortium and Symbologic agreed that the Consortium's work was about much more than technology and that both the work and the members would be better served by being independent and vendor agnostic. In 1996 Greg Oxton, who was a member of the Consortium at the time, joined the Consortium staff with the goal of creating a member funded non-profit organization.

In January 1997 the Consortium became an independent legal entity registered as a 501(c)(6) with the Internal Revenue Service. At that time it was called the Customer Support Consortium.

From 1997 through 1999 the Consortium members began to report dramatic benefits from implementing the methodology. In 1999 the Consortium released the first Practices Guide. This was written by Livia Wilson and John Chmaj. With the help of the members who shared their adoption experiences and results Wilson and Chmaj created the first prescriptive, comprehensive definition on how to do KCS.

For the next few years the Consortium facilitated member conversations and based on a model of collective thinking and shared experiences continued to evolve the KCS methodology.

In 2003, HDI partnered with the Consortium for Service Innovation to promote the learnings and experiences of the Consortium's members to the market. Working together, they captured this information into a three-day workshop: The Knowledge Management Foundations: KCS Principles course now known as KCS Principles. Since that time, hundreds of companies have been learning about and implementing Knowledge Centered Service within their environments.

In 2005, the Consortium for Service Innovation introduced the KCS-Verified program for knowledge management software vendors. There are a number of popular software applications verified to enable the KCS best practices to learn more about KCS Verified products. This program defines the functional requirements that software vendors must implement to successfully enable KCS. Implementation is then verified by KCS certified at one of levels, "Aligned" or "Verified". Program implementation is enabled through experts through the Consortium for Service Innovation or other certified practitioners.

In 2006, the Consortium updated KCS to version 4.1 and published the Practices Guide. Version 5.0 and 5.1 were published in 2011. Version 5.3 was published in 2012 and version 6.0 in 2016. They continue to evolve KCS through the experiences of their members and other companies that share their personal stories.

In 2007, HDI introduced the first KCS certification in the industry with the KCS Principles Certification that allows individuals to demonstrate their knowledge of the KCS methodology and how to implement it.

In 2010, The KCS Academy was formed as an outreach company of the Consortium for Service Innovation. Development of the KCS Certified Publisher exam began and became publicly available in 2011.

In June 2014, AXELOS and HDI jointly published a whitepaper on the Synergies between ITIL and KCS. While KCS and ITIL were developed independently, guidance on how these two best practices can be used together to enhance service management processes is helping support organizations to improve their operations.

In April 2016, the Consortium for Service Innovation released KCS v6. This release renamed Knowledge Centered Support to Knowledge Centered Service. The terminology in the methodology was updated to be more generic as KCS adoption has expanded beyond the technical support environment to the enterprise. The following documents were published: KCS Principles and Core Concepts and the KCS v6 Practices Guide
