= Clariion =

Storage array product

EMC Clariion
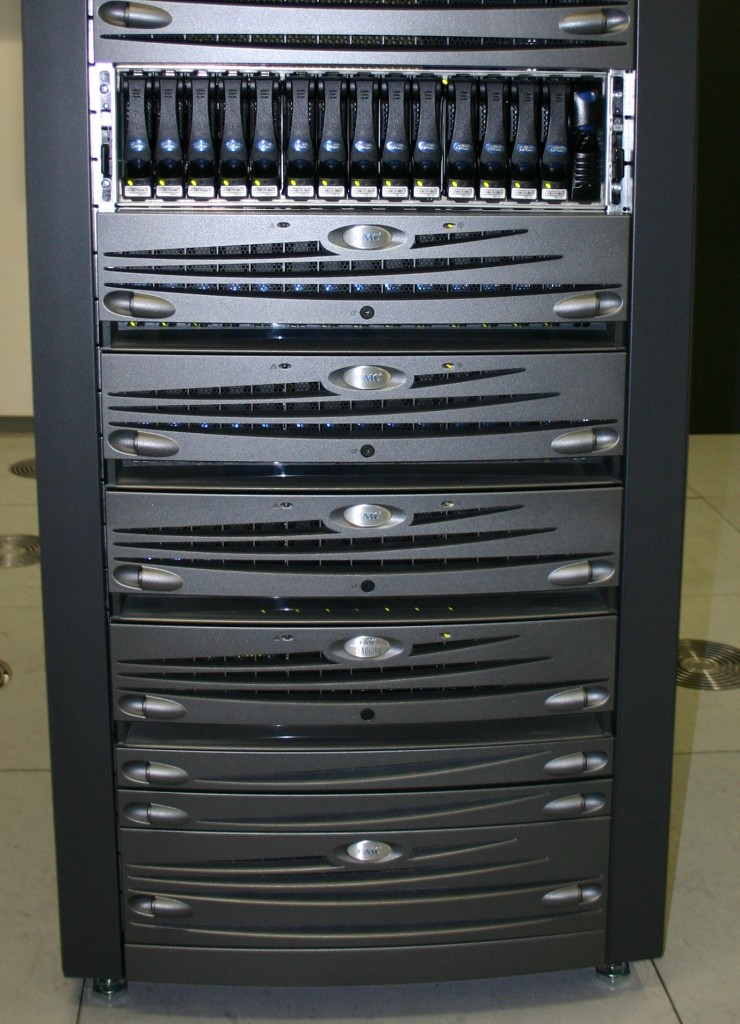
- Clariion CX500
- Developer: EMC Corporation (1999 - 2011); Data General (1994 - 1999)
- Type: Storage server
- Released: 1994; 32 years ago
- Discontinued: 2011
- Predecessor: Data General HADA
- Successor: EMC VNX, Dell EMC Unity
- Related: EMC Celerra

Clariion (styled CLARiiON) is a discontinued SAN disk array manufactured and sold by EMC Corporation, it occupied the entry-level and mid-range of EMC's SAN disk array products. In 2011, EMC introduced the EMC VNX Series, designed to replace both the Clariion and Celerra products.

Upon launch in 2008, the latest generation CX4 series storage arrays supported fibre channel and iSCSI front end bus connectivity. The fibre channel back end bus offered 4 Gbit/s of bandwidth with FC-SCSI disks or SATAII disks.

The EMC Celerra NAS device is based on the same X-blade architecture as the CLARiiON storage processor.

The first CLARiiON was developed in 1992 by Data General Corporation, one of the first minicomputer companies. CLARiiON was an early commercial example of a RAID product and initially sold exclusively as an array with the company's Aviion line of computer systems as the HADA (High Availability Disk Array) and later the HADA II before being made available for broader open systems attachment and renamed CLARiiON in 1994. Realizing the enormous potential of storage arrays, Data General created a separate Clariion division and began selling the product as an OEM offering to its systems competitors. While this somewhat lessened the advantages of Aviion in the marketplace, and was a source of internal corporate friction, it allowed the company to sell higher volumes and popularize the brand. The strategy paid dividends as the company was acquired by EMC in 1999, primarily for the CLARiiON line of products.

In 2011, EMC introduced the new VNX series of unified storage disk arrays intended to replace both CLARiiON and Celerra products. Internally the VNX is labeled the CX5. In early 2012, both CLARiiON and Celerra were discontinued.

== History ==
The Clariion disk array project started in the early 1990s when Tom West (the protagonist of the Pulitzer Prize winning book The Soul of a New Machine) convinced Data General to develop the array. West realized the potential for more advanced and openly compatible data-storage devices, as did competitors such as Digital Equipment Corporation with their StorageWorks product.

Patented in 1994, the Clariion disk array had some interesting features that later became standard in the data-storage and computing industry. Features mentioned in the patent paperwork included optional hot swapping, guide rails for proper electrical contact, and a method to lock the drives in place once they were secured in the disk enclosure. Other notable features include industry's first dual active-controller design, mirrored write cache, full system redundancy and hot repair.

The Clariion line was soon extended to contain SCSI disk arrays ranging from 7 to 30 slots. In 1997, Data General's Clariion division took the unusual step of adopting an emerging standard — Fibre Channel. The FC5000 array utilized a Fibre Channel Arbitrated Loop connection that doubled the performance of SCSI arrays at that time. It was also the first to use RAID level 5 on Fibre Channel drives.

From there, the Clariion range grew into a faster, more expandable midrange storage platform, culminating in the FC5700 under Data General. After EMC's acquisition of Data General, significant development of a new range of Clariion arrays took place, resulting in the FC4500 and FC4700. A special model was the IP4700, offering IP-based access to storage.

Within a couple of years, the first CX series of Clariions (CX200, CX400 and CX600) was developed. Subsequent processor and bandwidth upgrades led to a new CX lineup (CX300, CX500, CX700) and a low end SATA based Clariion array, the AX100 (now updated to AX150). In 2003, Clariion became the industry's first NEBS-certified storage system.

In May 2006, EMC introduced the third generation of Clariion, named CX3 UltraScale. The lineup, consisting of the CX3-20, CX3-40 and CX3-80, was the industry's only storage platform to leverage end-to-end 4 Gbit/s (4 billion bits per second) Fibre Channel and PCI-Express technologies. Later in 2007, the line was expanded to include a new entry-level storage system, the CX3-10.

Most newer Clariion models up to the CX-4 run a version of Windows XP Embedded.

== Architecture ==
The Clariion is built on an Intel platform and has quite unique software layer: it runs two operating environments in parallel. Windows XP Embedded or stripped-down version of Windows Server for management and maintenance tasks and proprietary UNIX-based FLARE as an actual "data mover". Embedded Windows (in the fourth generation this is 64-bit Windows Storage Server, the third generation used 32-bit Windows XP). The form factor is a half-width 1U or 2U device known as an X-blade, two of which are mounted side by side in the storage processor enclosure. This provides a fully redundant active-active configuration, with both storage processors serving requests and each acting as failover for the other so that initiators see the array as active-passive. An integrated UPS provides security for data in the event of power failure.

Storage is fibre-attached, initiators may be fibre- or IP-attached, the architecture supports both on the same array depending on configuration. Storage is connected via back-end loops with up to 120 drives per loop, the drives are contained in Disk Array Enclosures (DAEs) of 15 drives each.

The operating environment, FLARE (Fibre Logic Array Runtime Environment), resides on the first four disks of the first DAE (bus 0 enclosure 0), which is also supplied by the integrated UPS. In the event of power failure, this space is also used to store the contents of the write cache so that all writes are completed on restoration of power.

Management of the Clariion is usually through inbuilt Java-based management software called Navisphere.

With the fourth generation UltraFlex series, I/O is provided through pluggable modules providing either IP or fibre connectivity, allowing additional back-end and front-end connections to be added over the life of the array.

Advanced functionality of the Clariion is licensed and enabled through software. This includes SAN replication, Quality of service (QOS) and snapshots.

=== Unique issues ===
The CLARiiON was a dual controller active/passive array, meaning that it had a mirrored write cache, but only one controller was actively serving requests for any single LUN presented to initiators. This could cause issues with unsuspecting clients, one path would always appear dead. Accesses to it would trigger a reassignment of the LUN to the other controller, a so-called trespass. This had severe implications on IO performance, and on older models like the 4500 models, this could cause a controller to crash if the system was directly (loop) attached to multiple IO-heavy hosts. The second controller would then take over the load from the first one, crash due to the additional LUN trespasses. By this time, the first controller comes up and is missing a partner to sync to. At this point, some LUNs could end up with no controller responsible for them, so-called unassigned LUNs.

Crashes were uncommon when the use of FC fabrics become common place, but the general issue of trespassing lived on until a certain firmware (FLARE) level with ALUA support was released, ca. 2008.

== Product lineup ==
=== AX series ===
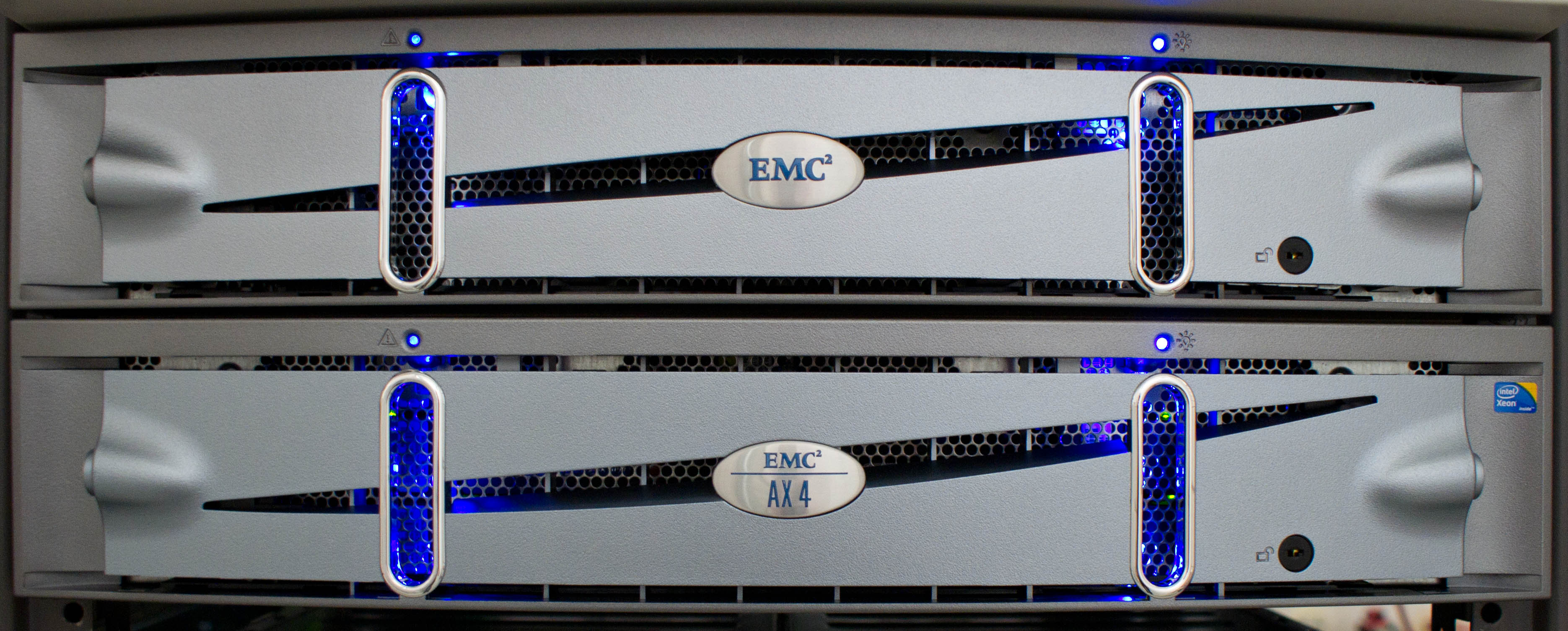
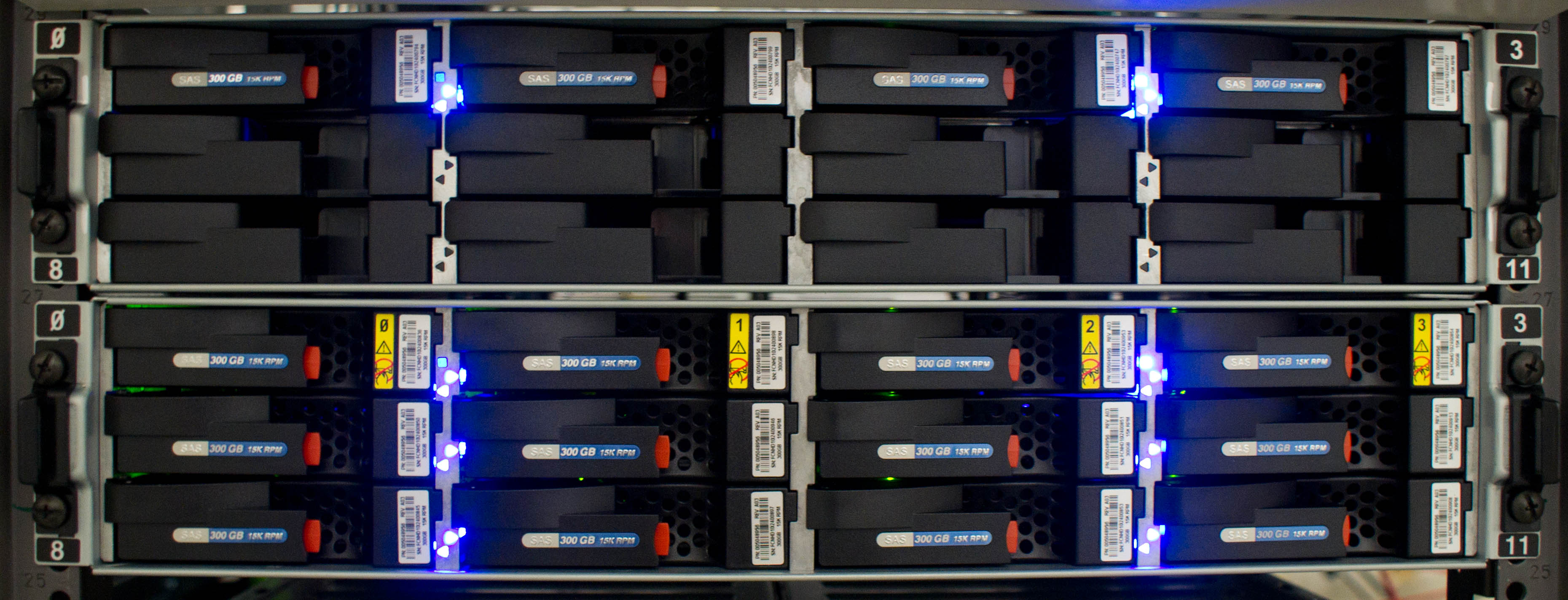
Two EMC Clariion AX4-5 with and without frontal plate

The AX series is considered the entry-level disk array.

Currently, two models are available the AX4 and the AX150. The AX150 supports up to 12 Serial ATA disks with either 250, 500 or 750 GB (1 GB = 10^{9} B) at a throughput of 150 (250 GB disks) or 300 MB/s (500, 750 GB disks) and, optionally, NCQ. Supported RAID levels are RAID 5 (with min. 3 disks) and RAID 1/0 (min. 4 disks). The Fibre Channel connection supports transfer speeds of up to 2 Gbit/s (with both AL and SW configurations), iSCSI is physically limited to max. 1 Gbit/s. The AX150 is available in four configurations which differ in connection and number of controllers.

The AX4 is the successor of the AX150 and can support up to 60 Serial ATA or Serial Attached SCSI disks (with "Expansion Pack"). The base version has only place for 12 disks. Similar to the AX150 it is available in iSCSI or Fibre Channel configurations. Opposed to the AX150 the AX4 supports Fibre Channel transfer speeds of up to 4 Gbit/s.

Model	Connection	# of controllers	speed	# of supported disks
AX150	FC	2	2 Gbit/s	12
AX150SC	FC	1	2 Gbit/s	12
AX150i	iSCSI	2	1 Gbit/s	12
AX150iSC	iSCSI	1	1 Gbit/s	12
AX4-5F	FC	1 or 2	4 Gbit/s	12 (60 with "Expansion Pack")
AX4-5I	iSCSI	1 or 2	1 Gbit/s	12 (60 with "Expansion Pack")

=== CX series ===
The CX series supports both SATA and Fibre Channel disks. Supported RAID levels are 1/0, 0, 1, 3, 5, and 6; the disks can be configured into groups with different RAID levels.

Models of the CX series come in two configurations: Fibre Channel (transfer speeds max. 2 Gbit/s) and iSCSI (max. 1 Gbit/s). The exception is the CX700, which is FC only. The names of the iSCSI models end with an i, e.g. CX500i.

Model	Max. FC hosts	Max. disk drives	Initial capacity	Max. capacity (1 TB = 10^{12} B)
CX300	64	60	365 GB	27 TB
CX500	128	120	4 TB	59 TB
CX700	256	240	4 TB(?)	119 TB

=== CX3 series ===
The CX3 series originally consisted of CX3-20, CX3-40, and CX3-80 models. Later the series was refreshed to include the CX3-10 and the "i" and "f" identifiers.

Model	Max. FC hosts	Max. disk drives	Initial capacity	Max. capacity (1 TB = 10^{12} B)
CX3-10	64	60	1 TB	60 TB
CX3-20	128	120	1 TB	120 TB
CX3-40	128	240	1 TB	240 TB
CX3-80	256	480	1 TB	480 TB

=== CX4 UltraFlex series ===
The CX4 UltraFlex series contains multiple models which differ in the maximum number of disks (SATA or Fibre Channel) and the number of iSCSI and FC connections. The PCI Express connection between the FC interface and the storage processor allows transfer speeds of up to 4 Gbit/s, while iSCSI supports speeds of max. 1 Gbit/s. All current models support RAID 0, 1, 1/0, 3, 5, and 6; as with the CX series, groups with differing RAID levels can be created.

Each CX4 array consists of dual redundant hot-swappable components including storage processors, mirrored cache and battery backup, as well as redundant power supplies. The CX4 series supports Fibre Channel and iSCSI host connectivity.

Major New Features in the CX4 UltraFlex Series include support for solid state flash drives, 64-bit FLARE Operating Environment and PCI-Express based SLIC I/O cards. The CX4-480 and CX-960 support fibre channel solid state flash drives introduced by EMC for the Symmetrix DMX-4 in January 2008. Solid State Flash drives offer a significant performance advantage over mechanical drives and provide a new storage tier which EMC calls Tier-0. The new version of the FLARE operating environment that ships with the CX4 series includes support for the 64-bit Intel Xeon CPUs in the Storage Processors. The CX4 Series is also the first product to use the new PCI Express based SLIC I/O cards. The product-agnostic SLIC I/O cards provide more flexibility for future upgrades as new technologies become available, such as 8 GBit Fibre Channel and 10 GBit Ethernet/iSCSI.

Model	Memory	Front-end FC ports	Front-end iSCSI ports	Back-end ports	Max. HA Hosts	Max. disk drives	Max. capacity	Flash Drives
CX4-120	6 GB	4	4	2	128	120	120 TB	Yes
CX4-240	8 GB	4	4	4	256	240	231 TB	Yes
CX4-480	16 GB	8	4	4	256	480	939 TB	Yes
CX4-960	32 GB	8	4	8	512	960	1899 TB	Yes
