= EMC Corporation =

American technology company (1986–2016)

- Type: Public
- Traded as: NYSE: EMC (1986–2016)
- Industry: Information technology
- Founded: August 1979; 47 years ago
- Founders: Richard Egan; Roger Marino
- Defunct: September 2016; 10 years ago
- Fate: Acquired by Dell Inc., forming Dell Technologies
- Headquarters: Hopkinton, Massachusetts, United States
- Area served: Worldwide
- Revenue: ▲US$41.224 billion (2021)

EMC Corporation (stylized as EMC²) was an American multinational corporation headquartered in Hopkinton, Massachusetts, which sold data storage, information security, virtualization, analytics, cloud computing and other products and services that enabled organizations to store, manage, protect, and analyze data. EMC's target markets included large companies and small- and medium-sized businesses across various vertical markets.

The company's stock (as EMC Corporation) was added to the New York Stock Exchange on April 6, 1986, and was also listed on the S&P 500 index. EMC acquired Iomega in 2008, and a 2013 partnership with Lenovo resulted in the rebranding of Iomega as LenovoEMC. EMC merged with the computer systems manufacturer Dell Inc. in 2016 to form Dell Technologies. This merger led to the joint venture with Lenovo dissolving; at that time, Forbes noted EMC's "focus on developing and selling data storage and data management hardware and software and convincing its customers to buy its products independent of their other IT buying decisions" based on "best-of-breed". Dell used the EMC name with some of its products under the Dell EMC brand until around 2020.

== History ==
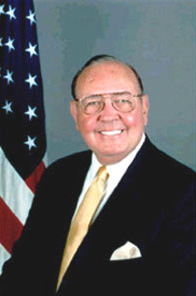
Richard Egan, co-founder of EMC Corporation

EMC, founded in 1979 by Richard Egan and Roger Marino (the E and M of EMC), introduced its first 64-kilobyte (65,536 bytes) memory boards for the Prime Computer in 1981. EMC continued to develop memory boards for other computer types. In the mid-1980s, the company expanded beyond memory to other computer data storage types and networked storage platforms. EMC began shipping its flagship product, the Symmetrix, in 1990.

While some of EMC's growth is credited to acquisitions of smaller companies, Symmetrix was the main factor in EMC's rapid growth during the 1990s, from a firm valued in the hundreds of millions of dollars to a multi-billion dollar company.

In 2009 EMC signed a two-year deal to be the principal shirt sponsor for English Rugby Union club London Wasps in a deal worth £1 Million. This was later extended until the end of the 2013 season.

Michael Ruettgers joined EMC in 1988 and was CEO from 1992 until January 2001. Under Ruettgers' leadership, EMC revenues grew from $120 million to nearly $9 billion 10 years later, and the company shifted its focus from memory boards to storage systems. Ruettgers was named one of BusinessWeek's "World's Top 25 Executives"; one of the "Best Chief Executive Officers in America" by Worth magazine; and one of Network World's "25 Most Powerful People in Networking".

Ahead of their acquisition by Dell, EMC gained a reputation for oppressive non-compete agreements and non-compete lobbying through AIM (Associated Industries of Massachusetts)

=== Acquisition by Dell ===
Logo of Dell EMC, brand formed after merger with Dell Inc.

On October 12, 2015, Dell Inc. announced its intent to acquire EMC in a cash-and-stock deal valued at $67 billion, which at the time was the largest-ever acquisition in the technology sector. The combination of Dell's enterprise server, personal computer, and mobile businesses with EMC's enterprise storage business was a significant vertical merger of IT giants. Dell offered $24.05 per share of EMC, and $9.05 per share of tracking stock in VMware.

On September 7, 2016, Dell Inc. completed the merger to form Dell Technologies, which involved the issuance of $45.9 billion in debt and $4.4 billion common stock. At the time, some analysts claimed that Dell's acquisition of the former Iomega could harm the LenovoEMC partnership.

Starting in 2018 and more prominently in 2019, Dell began transitioning from using "Dell EMC" to "Dell Technologies" as its brand name.

== Products and services ==
In addition to those of the majority-owned Pivotal company, Dell EMC sells products and services, including products from other Dell Technologies companies, designed to allow IT departments to move to a cloud computing model and to analyze big data. LenovoEMC, formerly Iomega, sells storage products.

Product category	Products/Services
Information Storage	PowerStore, PowerFlex, PowerMax, Unity XT, PowerVault, PowerScale, Objectscale, XtremIO, Atmos, ECS
Archiving, Backup, and Recovery	Avamar, DataDomain, NetWorker, RecoverPoint, Centera, SourceOne
Storage and Content Management	Service Assurance Suite, Appsync, PowerPath, ViPR SRM, ViPR Controller
Virtualization	VMware, VPLEX
Services	Consulting, Customer support, Education Services, Managed Services, Technology Services and Solutions
Security/Compliance	RSA Security, Dell SecureWorks
Cloud computing/Converged Infrastructure	VxBlock, VxRack, VxRail, VSPEX, Virtustream
Servers	PowerEdge
Data Computing	Greenplum, Pivotal

== Major acquisitions ==
The following table includes the listing and timeline of EMC Corporation's major acquisitions of other companies since 1996.

Year	Storage	Storage & management software	Content management	Virtualization	Services	Security/compliance	Cloud computing	Data computing
1996–2000	Data General, CrosStor	Softworks, Avalon						
2001–2005	FilePool, Allocity	Luminate, Prisa Networks, Legato Networker, Dantz/Retrospect, Smarts Astrum	Documentum, Ask Once, Acartus, Captiva Software	VMware Rainfinity, Acxiom	Internosis			
2006–2010	Avamar, Iomega, Data Domain, Isilon Systems Bus-Tech, Indigo Stone	Kashya, nLayers, Voyence, Infra Corporation, WysDM, Configuresoft, Fastscale	Pro Activity, X-Hive, Dokumentum, Document Sciences, Kazeon	Akimbi, YottaYotta	Interlink, Geniant, Business Edge, Conchango	RSA Security, Authentica, Network Intelligence, Valyd, Verid, Tablus, Archer Technologies	Mozy, Pi, Source Labs	Greenplum
2011–2016	XtremIO, Likewise ScaleIO	Watch4Net, iWave, TwinStrata	Syncplicity(spun off in 2015)	Syncplicity(spun off in 2015), Trinity Technologies	Asankya	Netwitness, Silicium Security, Silver Tail Systems Aveksa	Virtustream	ZettaPoint, Pivotal Labs, MoreVRP

== Big data projects ==
In 2012, EMC sponsored The Human Face of Big Data, a globally crowdsourced media project focusing on the ability to collect, analyze, triangulate and visualize vast amounts of data in real-time. The Human Face of Big Data, produced by Rick Smolan and Jennifer Erwitt, includes "a number of fascinating stories ... [that] represent some of the most innovative applications of data that are shaping our future".

== See also ==
- Connectrix
